

463001–463100 

|-bgcolor=#d6d6d6
| 463001 ||  || — || March 8, 2005 || Mount Lemmon || Mount Lemmon Survey || VER || align=right | 2.8 km || 
|-id=002 bgcolor=#E9E9E9
| 463002 ||  || — || September 6, 2008 || Mount Lemmon || Mount Lemmon Survey || — || align=right | 1.9 km || 
|-id=003 bgcolor=#d6d6d6
| 463003 ||  || — || September 26, 2008 || Kitt Peak || Spacewatch || — || align=right | 2.3 km || 
|-id=004 bgcolor=#d6d6d6
| 463004 ||  || — || November 21, 2009 || Catalina || CSS || — || align=right | 2.3 km || 
|-id=005 bgcolor=#d6d6d6
| 463005 ||  || — || September 26, 2008 || Kitt Peak || Spacewatch || — || align=right | 3.2 km || 
|-id=006 bgcolor=#d6d6d6
| 463006 ||  || — || February 1, 2006 || Catalina || CSS || BRA || align=right | 1.9 km || 
|-id=007 bgcolor=#fefefe
| 463007 ||  || — || October 11, 2004 || Kitt Peak || Spacewatch || H || align=right data-sort-value="0.68" | 680 m || 
|-id=008 bgcolor=#E9E9E9
| 463008 ||  || — || April 13, 2002 || Palomar || Spacewatch || — || align=right | 2.3 km || 
|-id=009 bgcolor=#d6d6d6
| 463009 ||  || — || March 11, 2011 || Mount Lemmon || Mount Lemmon Survey || — || align=right | 2.4 km || 
|-id=010 bgcolor=#d6d6d6
| 463010 ||  || — || September 27, 2008 || Mount Lemmon || Mount Lemmon Survey || VER || align=right | 2.1 km || 
|-id=011 bgcolor=#d6d6d6
| 463011 ||  || — || September 4, 2007 || Catalina || CSS || — || align=right | 2.7 km || 
|-id=012 bgcolor=#d6d6d6
| 463012 ||  || — || May 24, 2001 || Apache Point || SDSS || — || align=right | 2.8 km || 
|-id=013 bgcolor=#FA8072
| 463013 ||  || — || April 2, 2011 || Mount Lemmon || Mount Lemmon Survey || — || align=right data-sort-value="0.43" | 430 m || 
|-id=014 bgcolor=#E9E9E9
| 463014 ||  || — || September 2, 2008 || Kitt Peak || Spacewatch || — || align=right | 2.0 km || 
|-id=015 bgcolor=#d6d6d6
| 463015 ||  || — || August 10, 2007 || Kitt Peak || Spacewatch || — || align=right | 2.1 km || 
|-id=016 bgcolor=#d6d6d6
| 463016 ||  || — || January 7, 2010 || Kitt Peak || Spacewatch || — || align=right | 3.1 km || 
|-id=017 bgcolor=#d6d6d6
| 463017 ||  || — || March 2, 2006 || Mount Lemmon || Mount Lemmon Survey || — || align=right | 2.7 km || 
|-id=018 bgcolor=#d6d6d6
| 463018 ||  || — || March 17, 2010 || WISE || WISE || — || align=right | 3.2 km || 
|-id=019 bgcolor=#d6d6d6
| 463019 ||  || — || September 11, 2007 || Catalina || CSS || — || align=right | 3.5 km || 
|-id=020 bgcolor=#d6d6d6
| 463020 ||  || — || February 25, 2011 || Mount Lemmon || Mount Lemmon Survey || — || align=right | 2.8 km || 
|-id=021 bgcolor=#d6d6d6
| 463021 ||  || — || October 1, 2008 || Mount Lemmon || Mount Lemmon Survey || — || align=right | 3.0 km || 
|-id=022 bgcolor=#d6d6d6
| 463022 ||  || — || April 12, 2011 || Catalina || CSS || — || align=right | 3.2 km || 
|-id=023 bgcolor=#d6d6d6
| 463023 ||  || — || January 10, 2010 || Mount Lemmon || Mount Lemmon Survey || — || align=right | 2.7 km || 
|-id=024 bgcolor=#fefefe
| 463024 ||  || — || May 25, 2006 || Mount Lemmon || Mount Lemmon Survey || H || align=right data-sort-value="0.53" | 530 m || 
|-id=025 bgcolor=#d6d6d6
| 463025 ||  || — || May 8, 2006 || Kitt Peak || Spacewatch || — || align=right | 2.0 km || 
|-id=026 bgcolor=#d6d6d6
| 463026 ||  || — || March 26, 2011 || Kitt Peak || Spacewatch || — || align=right | 2.7 km || 
|-id=027 bgcolor=#d6d6d6
| 463027 ||  || — || September 14, 2007 || Mount Lemmon || Mount Lemmon Survey || — || align=right | 2.3 km || 
|-id=028 bgcolor=#d6d6d6
| 463028 ||  || — || March 26, 2011 || Mount Lemmon || Mount Lemmon Survey || — || align=right | 2.9 km || 
|-id=029 bgcolor=#d6d6d6
| 463029 ||  || — || April 6, 2011 || Kitt Peak || Spacewatch || HYG || align=right | 2.8 km || 
|-id=030 bgcolor=#d6d6d6
| 463030 ||  || — || March 12, 2010 || WISE || WISE || — || align=right | 2.4 km || 
|-id=031 bgcolor=#d6d6d6
| 463031 ||  || — || April 13, 2011 || Mount Lemmon || Mount Lemmon Survey || — || align=right | 2.6 km || 
|-id=032 bgcolor=#FA8072
| 463032 ||  || — || April 28, 2011 || Kitt Peak || Spacewatch || H || align=right data-sort-value="0.77" | 770 m || 
|-id=033 bgcolor=#d6d6d6
| 463033 ||  || — || November 9, 2008 || Mount Lemmon || Mount Lemmon Survey || — || align=right | 3.3 km || 
|-id=034 bgcolor=#d6d6d6
| 463034 ||  || — || April 10, 2010 || WISE || WISE || LIX || align=right | 3.5 km || 
|-id=035 bgcolor=#d6d6d6
| 463035 ||  || — || April 22, 2011 || Kitt Peak || Spacewatch || — || align=right | 3.2 km || 
|-id=036 bgcolor=#d6d6d6
| 463036 ||  || — || April 23, 2011 || Kitt Peak || Spacewatch || — || align=right | 2.8 km || 
|-id=037 bgcolor=#d6d6d6
| 463037 ||  || — || February 9, 2005 || Mount Lemmon || Mount Lemmon Survey || — || align=right | 2.3 km || 
|-id=038 bgcolor=#d6d6d6
| 463038 ||  || — || March 4, 2005 || Mount Lemmon || Mount Lemmon Survey || — || align=right | 2.9 km || 
|-id=039 bgcolor=#d6d6d6
| 463039 ||  || — || September 22, 2008 || Mount Lemmon || Mount Lemmon Survey || EOS || align=right | 1.8 km || 
|-id=040 bgcolor=#d6d6d6
| 463040 ||  || — || January 13, 2010 || Mount Lemmon || Mount Lemmon Survey || — || align=right | 3.6 km || 
|-id=041 bgcolor=#d6d6d6
| 463041 ||  || — || March 24, 2011 || Kitt Peak || Spacewatch || — || align=right | 2.7 km || 
|-id=042 bgcolor=#d6d6d6
| 463042 ||  || — || April 28, 2010 || WISE || WISE || — || align=right | 3.4 km || 
|-id=043 bgcolor=#d6d6d6
| 463043 ||  || — || April 25, 2010 || WISE || WISE || — || align=right | 3.6 km || 
|-id=044 bgcolor=#fefefe
| 463044 ||  || — || April 28, 2011 || Socorro || LINEAR || H || align=right data-sort-value="0.88" | 880 m || 
|-id=045 bgcolor=#d6d6d6
| 463045 ||  || — || November 1, 2008 || Mount Lemmon || Mount Lemmon Survey || — || align=right | 2.8 km || 
|-id=046 bgcolor=#fefefe
| 463046 ||  || — || April 23, 2011 || Kitt Peak || Spacewatch || H || align=right data-sort-value="0.48" | 480 m || 
|-id=047 bgcolor=#d6d6d6
| 463047 ||  || — || March 28, 2011 || Catalina || CSS || — || align=right | 3.1 km || 
|-id=048 bgcolor=#d6d6d6
| 463048 ||  || — || May 22, 2006 || Kitt Peak || Spacewatch || — || align=right | 2.1 km || 
|-id=049 bgcolor=#d6d6d6
| 463049 ||  || — || January 7, 2010 || Kitt Peak || Spacewatch || — || align=right | 2.5 km || 
|-id=050 bgcolor=#d6d6d6
| 463050 ||  || — || April 1, 2011 || Kitt Peak || Spacewatch || — || align=right | 3.1 km || 
|-id=051 bgcolor=#d6d6d6
| 463051 ||  || — || February 14, 2010 || Mount Lemmon || Mount Lemmon Survey || — || align=right | 2.7 km || 
|-id=052 bgcolor=#d6d6d6
| 463052 ||  || — || February 17, 2010 || Kitt Peak || Spacewatch || — || align=right | 3.8 km || 
|-id=053 bgcolor=#d6d6d6
| 463053 ||  || — || May 11, 2010 || WISE || WISE || — || align=right | 4.2 km || 
|-id=054 bgcolor=#d6d6d6
| 463054 ||  || — || May 25, 2006 || Mount Lemmon || Mount Lemmon Survey || — || align=right | 2.5 km || 
|-id=055 bgcolor=#d6d6d6
| 463055 ||  || — || May 20, 2006 || Kitt Peak || Spacewatch || — || align=right | 3.0 km || 
|-id=056 bgcolor=#d6d6d6
| 463056 ||  || — || April 23, 2011 || Kitt Peak || Spacewatch || — || align=right | 5.2 km || 
|-id=057 bgcolor=#d6d6d6
| 463057 ||  || — || April 21, 2006 || Kitt Peak || Spacewatch || — || align=right | 2.5 km || 
|-id=058 bgcolor=#d6d6d6
| 463058 ||  || — || October 6, 2008 || Mount Lemmon || Mount Lemmon Survey || EOS || align=right | 1.8 km || 
|-id=059 bgcolor=#d6d6d6
| 463059 ||  || — || October 26, 2009 || Kitt Peak || Spacewatch || — || align=right | 1.9 km || 
|-id=060 bgcolor=#d6d6d6
| 463060 ||  || — || February 9, 2005 || Kitt Peak || Spacewatch || — || align=right | 2.0 km || 
|-id=061 bgcolor=#d6d6d6
| 463061 ||  || — || February 25, 2011 || Mount Lemmon || Mount Lemmon Survey || — || align=right | 2.1 km || 
|-id=062 bgcolor=#d6d6d6
| 463062 ||  || — || March 9, 2005 || Mount Lemmon || Mount Lemmon Survey || EOS || align=right | 1.8 km || 
|-id=063 bgcolor=#d6d6d6
| 463063 ||  || — || March 13, 2010 || WISE || WISE || — || align=right | 2.7 km || 
|-id=064 bgcolor=#d6d6d6
| 463064 ||  || — || March 2, 2011 || Mount Lemmon || Mount Lemmon Survey || — || align=right | 2.7 km || 
|-id=065 bgcolor=#d6d6d6
| 463065 ||  || — || February 13, 2004 || Kitt Peak || Spacewatch || — || align=right | 3.1 km || 
|-id=066 bgcolor=#d6d6d6
| 463066 ||  || — || April 13, 2011 || Kitt Peak || Spacewatch || — || align=right | 2.7 km || 
|-id=067 bgcolor=#fefefe
| 463067 ||  || — || May 5, 2011 || Catalina || CSS || H || align=right data-sort-value="0.87" | 870 m || 
|-id=068 bgcolor=#E9E9E9
| 463068 ||  || — || September 22, 2008 || Kitt Peak || Spacewatch || — || align=right | 2.9 km || 
|-id=069 bgcolor=#d6d6d6
| 463069 ||  || — || November 1, 2007 || Mount Lemmon || Mount Lemmon Survey || — || align=right | 4.0 km || 
|-id=070 bgcolor=#d6d6d6
| 463070 ||  || — || April 20, 2006 || Kitt Peak || Spacewatch || — || align=right | 2.3 km || 
|-id=071 bgcolor=#d6d6d6
| 463071 ||  || — || April 10, 2005 || Kitt Peak || Spacewatch || — || align=right | 3.2 km || 
|-id=072 bgcolor=#d6d6d6
| 463072 ||  || — || September 25, 2008 || Mount Lemmon || Mount Lemmon Survey || VER || align=right | 2.8 km || 
|-id=073 bgcolor=#d6d6d6
| 463073 ||  || — || April 28, 2011 || Kitt Peak || Spacewatch || VER || align=right | 3.4 km || 
|-id=074 bgcolor=#d6d6d6
| 463074 ||  || — || April 16, 2010 || WISE || WISE || — || align=right | 2.9 km || 
|-id=075 bgcolor=#d6d6d6
| 463075 ||  || — || May 27, 2000 || Socorro || LINEAR || — || align=right | 3.0 km || 
|-id=076 bgcolor=#d6d6d6
| 463076 ||  || — || April 16, 2010 || WISE || WISE || — || align=right | 3.3 km || 
|-id=077 bgcolor=#d6d6d6
| 463077 ||  || — || October 9, 2007 || Mount Lemmon || Mount Lemmon Survey || Tj (2.97) || align=right | 4.1 km || 
|-id=078 bgcolor=#d6d6d6
| 463078 ||  || — || May 6, 2010 || WISE || WISE || — || align=right | 2.8 km || 
|-id=079 bgcolor=#d6d6d6
| 463079 ||  || — || April 10, 2005 || Mount Lemmon || Mount Lemmon Survey || — || align=right | 2.6 km || 
|-id=080 bgcolor=#fefefe
| 463080 ||  || — || June 12, 2011 || Mount Lemmon || Mount Lemmon Survey || H || align=right data-sort-value="0.85" | 850 m || 
|-id=081 bgcolor=#d6d6d6
| 463081 ||  || — || February 4, 2010 || WISE || WISE || — || align=right | 4.8 km || 
|-id=082 bgcolor=#fefefe
| 463082 ||  || — || August 4, 2011 || Siding Spring || SSS || H || align=right data-sort-value="0.78" | 780 m || 
|-id=083 bgcolor=#fefefe
| 463083 ||  || — || August 23, 2011 || Socorro || LINEAR || H || align=right data-sort-value="0.87" | 870 m || 
|-id=084 bgcolor=#fefefe
| 463084 ||  || — || September 12, 2004 || Kitt Peak || Spacewatch || — || align=right data-sort-value="0.54" | 540 m || 
|-id=085 bgcolor=#fefefe
| 463085 ||  || — || December 1, 2008 || Kitt Peak || Spacewatch || — || align=right data-sort-value="0.48" | 480 m || 
|-id=086 bgcolor=#fefefe
| 463086 ||  || — || September 26, 2011 || Kitt Peak || Spacewatch || — || align=right data-sort-value="0.58" | 580 m || 
|-id=087 bgcolor=#fefefe
| 463087 ||  || — || September 26, 2011 || Kitt Peak || Spacewatch || — || align=right data-sort-value="0.62" | 620 m || 
|-id=088 bgcolor=#d6d6d6
| 463088 ||  || — || September 24, 2011 || Mount Lemmon || Mount Lemmon Survey || 3:2 || align=right | 4.5 km || 
|-id=089 bgcolor=#FA8072
| 463089 ||  || — || March 1, 2009 || Socorro || LINEAR || — || align=right data-sort-value="0.68" | 680 m || 
|-id=090 bgcolor=#fefefe
| 463090 ||  || — || May 9, 2010 || Mount Lemmon || Mount Lemmon Survey || — || align=right data-sort-value="0.75" | 750 m || 
|-id=091 bgcolor=#fefefe
| 463091 ||  || — || November 3, 2004 || Anderson Mesa || LONEOS || — || align=right data-sort-value="0.87" | 870 m || 
|-id=092 bgcolor=#fefefe
| 463092 ||  || — || October 10, 2001 || Palomar || NEAT || — || align=right data-sort-value="0.56" | 560 m || 
|-id=093 bgcolor=#fefefe
| 463093 ||  || — || October 18, 2011 || Mount Lemmon || Mount Lemmon Survey || — || align=right data-sort-value="0.77" | 770 m || 
|-id=094 bgcolor=#fefefe
| 463094 ||  || — || December 1, 2008 || Mount Lemmon || Mount Lemmon Survey || — || align=right data-sort-value="0.74" | 740 m || 
|-id=095 bgcolor=#fefefe
| 463095 ||  || — || October 19, 2011 || Kitt Peak || Spacewatch || — || align=right data-sort-value="0.64" | 640 m || 
|-id=096 bgcolor=#fefefe
| 463096 ||  || — || November 4, 2004 || Kitt Peak || Spacewatch || — || align=right data-sort-value="0.68" | 680 m || 
|-id=097 bgcolor=#fefefe
| 463097 ||  || — || December 15, 2004 || Kitt Peak || Spacewatch || — || align=right data-sort-value="0.62" | 620 m || 
|-id=098 bgcolor=#fefefe
| 463098 ||  || — || January 17, 2009 || Kitt Peak || Spacewatch || — || align=right data-sort-value="0.52" | 520 m || 
|-id=099 bgcolor=#fefefe
| 463099 ||  || — || October 18, 2011 || Mount Lemmon || Mount Lemmon Survey || — || align=right data-sort-value="0.71" | 710 m || 
|-id=100 bgcolor=#fefefe
| 463100 ||  || — || September 29, 2011 || Mount Lemmon || Mount Lemmon Survey || — || align=right data-sort-value="0.57" | 570 m || 
|}

463101–463200 

|-bgcolor=#fefefe
| 463101 ||  || — || December 7, 2008 || Mount Lemmon || Mount Lemmon Survey || — || align=right data-sort-value="0.62" | 620 m || 
|-id=102 bgcolor=#fefefe
| 463102 ||  || — || September 27, 2000 || Kitt Peak || Spacewatch || — || align=right data-sort-value="0.68" | 680 m || 
|-id=103 bgcolor=#fefefe
| 463103 ||  || — || December 31, 2008 || Catalina || CSS || — || align=right data-sort-value="0.69" | 690 m || 
|-id=104 bgcolor=#fefefe
| 463104 ||  || — || September 20, 2011 || Kitt Peak || Spacewatch || — || align=right data-sort-value="0.55" | 550 m || 
|-id=105 bgcolor=#fefefe
| 463105 ||  || — || August 25, 2001 || Kitt Peak || Spacewatch || — || align=right data-sort-value="0.67" | 670 m || 
|-id=106 bgcolor=#fefefe
| 463106 ||  || — || November 4, 2004 || Kitt Peak || Spacewatch || — || align=right data-sort-value="0.48" | 480 m || 
|-id=107 bgcolor=#fefefe
| 463107 ||  || — || October 14, 2001 || Kitt Peak || Spacewatch || — || align=right data-sort-value="0.50" | 500 m || 
|-id=108 bgcolor=#fefefe
| 463108 ||  || — || November 20, 2004 || Kitt Peak || Spacewatch || — || align=right data-sort-value="0.62" | 620 m || 
|-id=109 bgcolor=#fefefe
| 463109 ||  || — || October 20, 2011 || Kitt Peak || Spacewatch || — || align=right data-sort-value="0.69" | 690 m || 
|-id=110 bgcolor=#fefefe
| 463110 ||  || — || October 22, 2011 || Kitt Peak || Spacewatch || (2076) || align=right data-sort-value="0.64" | 640 m || 
|-id=111 bgcolor=#fefefe
| 463111 ||  || — || October 23, 2011 || Kitt Peak || Spacewatch || — || align=right data-sort-value="0.54" | 540 m || 
|-id=112 bgcolor=#fefefe
| 463112 ||  || — || December 30, 2008 || Mount Lemmon || Mount Lemmon Survey || — || align=right data-sort-value="0.62" | 620 m || 
|-id=113 bgcolor=#fefefe
| 463113 ||  || — || January 2, 2009 || Kitt Peak || Spacewatch || — || align=right data-sort-value="0.66" | 660 m || 
|-id=114 bgcolor=#fefefe
| 463114 ||  || — || February 2, 2009 || Kitt Peak || Spacewatch || — || align=right data-sort-value="0.52" | 520 m || 
|-id=115 bgcolor=#fefefe
| 463115 ||  || — || September 24, 2011 || Mount Lemmon || Mount Lemmon Survey || — || align=right data-sort-value="0.62" | 620 m || 
|-id=116 bgcolor=#fefefe
| 463116 ||  || — || November 3, 2004 || Kitt Peak || Spacewatch || — || align=right data-sort-value="0.53" | 530 m || 
|-id=117 bgcolor=#fefefe
| 463117 ||  || — || October 9, 2004 || Kitt Peak || Spacewatch || — || align=right data-sort-value="0.56" | 560 m || 
|-id=118 bgcolor=#fefefe
| 463118 ||  || — || October 21, 2011 || Mount Lemmon || Mount Lemmon Survey || NYS || align=right data-sort-value="0.51" | 510 m || 
|-id=119 bgcolor=#fefefe
| 463119 ||  || — || September 11, 2001 || Socorro || LINEAR || — || align=right data-sort-value="0.67" | 670 m || 
|-id=120 bgcolor=#E9E9E9
| 463120 ||  || — || October 25, 2011 || Kitt Peak || Spacewatch || — || align=right | 2.3 km || 
|-id=121 bgcolor=#fefefe
| 463121 ||  || — || February 1, 2009 || Kitt Peak || Spacewatch || — || align=right data-sort-value="0.80" | 800 m || 
|-id=122 bgcolor=#fefefe
| 463122 ||  || — || September 23, 2011 || Mount Lemmon || Mount Lemmon Survey || — || align=right data-sort-value="0.62" | 620 m || 
|-id=123 bgcolor=#fefefe
| 463123 ||  || — || September 27, 2008 || Mount Lemmon || Mount Lemmon Survey || — || align=right data-sort-value="0.59" | 590 m || 
|-id=124 bgcolor=#fefefe
| 463124 ||  || — || October 20, 2011 || Kitt Peak || Spacewatch || — || align=right data-sort-value="0.55" | 550 m || 
|-id=125 bgcolor=#fefefe
| 463125 ||  || — || January 29, 2009 || Kitt Peak || Spacewatch || — || align=right data-sort-value="0.62" | 620 m || 
|-id=126 bgcolor=#fefefe
| 463126 ||  || — || March 10, 1999 || Kitt Peak || Spacewatch || — || align=right data-sort-value="0.60" | 600 m || 
|-id=127 bgcolor=#fefefe
| 463127 ||  || — || September 17, 2004 || Kitt Peak || Spacewatch || (2076) || align=right data-sort-value="0.58" | 580 m || 
|-id=128 bgcolor=#fefefe
| 463128 ||  || — || October 20, 2011 || Mount Lemmon || Mount Lemmon Survey || V || align=right data-sort-value="0.54" | 540 m || 
|-id=129 bgcolor=#fefefe
| 463129 ||  || — || October 29, 2011 || Kitt Peak || Spacewatch || — || align=right data-sort-value="0.62" | 620 m || 
|-id=130 bgcolor=#fefefe
| 463130 ||  || — || January 31, 2009 || Mount Lemmon || Mount Lemmon Survey || — || align=right data-sort-value="0.57" | 570 m || 
|-id=131 bgcolor=#fefefe
| 463131 ||  || — || February 20, 2009 || Mount Lemmon || Mount Lemmon Survey || — || align=right data-sort-value="0.53" | 530 m || 
|-id=132 bgcolor=#fefefe
| 463132 ||  || — || November 23, 2011 || Mount Lemmon || Mount Lemmon Survey || MAS || align=right data-sort-value="0.56" | 560 m || 
|-id=133 bgcolor=#fefefe
| 463133 ||  || — || January 13, 2005 || Socorro || LINEAR || — || align=right | 1.2 km || 
|-id=134 bgcolor=#fefefe
| 463134 ||  || — || January 18, 2009 || Kitt Peak || Spacewatch || — || align=right data-sort-value="0.58" | 580 m || 
|-id=135 bgcolor=#fefefe
| 463135 ||  || — || November 16, 2011 || Kitt Peak || Spacewatch || — || align=right data-sort-value="0.73" | 730 m || 
|-id=136 bgcolor=#fefefe
| 463136 ||  || — || December 10, 2004 || Kitt Peak || Spacewatch || — || align=right data-sort-value="0.66" | 660 m || 
|-id=137 bgcolor=#fefefe
| 463137 ||  || — || December 20, 2004 || Mount Lemmon || Mount Lemmon Survey || — || align=right data-sort-value="0.72" | 720 m || 
|-id=138 bgcolor=#fefefe
| 463138 ||  || — || December 11, 2004 || Kitt Peak || Spacewatch || — || align=right data-sort-value="0.72" | 720 m || 
|-id=139 bgcolor=#fefefe
| 463139 ||  || — || November 23, 2011 || Kitt Peak || Spacewatch || — || align=right data-sort-value="0.76" | 760 m || 
|-id=140 bgcolor=#fefefe
| 463140 ||  || — || January 15, 2005 || Kitt Peak || Spacewatch || — || align=right data-sort-value="0.73" | 730 m || 
|-id=141 bgcolor=#fefefe
| 463141 ||  || — || December 27, 2011 || Mount Lemmon || Mount Lemmon Survey || — || align=right data-sort-value="0.75" | 750 m || 
|-id=142 bgcolor=#fefefe
| 463142 ||  || — || October 15, 2007 || Kitt Peak || Spacewatch || — || align=right data-sort-value="0.57" | 570 m || 
|-id=143 bgcolor=#fefefe
| 463143 ||  || — || December 25, 2011 || Kitt Peak || Spacewatch || — || align=right data-sort-value="0.98" | 980 m || 
|-id=144 bgcolor=#fefefe
| 463144 ||  || — || December 25, 2011 || Mount Lemmon || Mount Lemmon Survey || — || align=right data-sort-value="0.68" | 680 m || 
|-id=145 bgcolor=#fefefe
| 463145 ||  || — || December 26, 2011 || Kitt Peak || Spacewatch || V || align=right data-sort-value="0.54" | 540 m || 
|-id=146 bgcolor=#fefefe
| 463146 ||  || — || November 2, 2007 || Kitt Peak || Spacewatch || — || align=right data-sort-value="0.65" | 650 m || 
|-id=147 bgcolor=#fefefe
| 463147 ||  || — || December 27, 2011 || Kitt Peak || Spacewatch || — || align=right data-sort-value="0.82" | 820 m || 
|-id=148 bgcolor=#fefefe
| 463148 ||  || — || November 28, 2011 || Mount Lemmon || Mount Lemmon Survey || — || align=right data-sort-value="0.76" | 760 m || 
|-id=149 bgcolor=#fefefe
| 463149 ||  || — || March 19, 2009 || Kitt Peak || Spacewatch || — || align=right data-sort-value="0.76" | 760 m || 
|-id=150 bgcolor=#fefefe
| 463150 ||  || — || November 18, 2007 || Mount Lemmon || Mount Lemmon Survey || — || align=right data-sort-value="0.70" | 700 m || 
|-id=151 bgcolor=#fefefe
| 463151 ||  || — || February 14, 2005 || Kitt Peak || Spacewatch || — || align=right data-sort-value="0.73" | 730 m || 
|-id=152 bgcolor=#fefefe
| 463152 ||  || — || November 26, 2003 || Kitt Peak || Spacewatch || — || align=right data-sort-value="0.72" | 720 m || 
|-id=153 bgcolor=#fefefe
| 463153 ||  || — || December 24, 2011 || Mount Lemmon || Mount Lemmon Survey || — || align=right data-sort-value="0.77" | 770 m || 
|-id=154 bgcolor=#fefefe
| 463154 ||  || — || October 9, 2007 || Kitt Peak || Spacewatch || NYS || align=right data-sort-value="0.58" | 580 m || 
|-id=155 bgcolor=#fefefe
| 463155 ||  || — || February 4, 2009 || Mount Lemmon || Mount Lemmon Survey || — || align=right | 1.1 km || 
|-id=156 bgcolor=#fefefe
| 463156 ||  || — || December 27, 2011 || Kitt Peak || Spacewatch || — || align=right data-sort-value="0.70" | 700 m || 
|-id=157 bgcolor=#fefefe
| 463157 ||  || — || November 26, 2011 || Mount Lemmon || Mount Lemmon Survey || — || align=right data-sort-value="0.85" | 850 m || 
|-id=158 bgcolor=#fefefe
| 463158 ||  || — || October 15, 2007 || Kitt Peak || Spacewatch || — || align=right data-sort-value="0.64" | 640 m || 
|-id=159 bgcolor=#fefefe
| 463159 ||  || — || March 8, 2005 || Mount Lemmon || Mount Lemmon Survey || — || align=right data-sort-value="0.67" | 670 m || 
|-id=160 bgcolor=#fefefe
| 463160 ||  || — || December 25, 2011 || Mount Lemmon || Mount Lemmon Survey || — || align=right data-sort-value="0.83" | 830 m || 
|-id=161 bgcolor=#fefefe
| 463161 ||  || — || December 27, 2011 || Mount Lemmon || Mount Lemmon Survey || NYS || align=right data-sort-value="0.74" | 740 m || 
|-id=162 bgcolor=#fefefe
| 463162 ||  || — || January 18, 2012 || Kitt Peak || Spacewatch || — || align=right data-sort-value="0.72" | 720 m || 
|-id=163 bgcolor=#fefefe
| 463163 ||  || — || March 24, 2009 || Mount Lemmon || Mount Lemmon Survey || — || align=right data-sort-value="0.90" | 900 m || 
|-id=164 bgcolor=#E9E9E9
| 463164 ||  || — || December 29, 2011 || Mount Lemmon || Mount Lemmon Survey || — || align=right | 1.5 km || 
|-id=165 bgcolor=#fefefe
| 463165 ||  || — || January 20, 2012 || Kitt Peak || Spacewatch || NYS || align=right data-sort-value="0.64" | 640 m || 
|-id=166 bgcolor=#fefefe
| 463166 ||  || — || October 10, 2007 || Catalina || CSS || — || align=right data-sort-value="0.78" | 780 m || 
|-id=167 bgcolor=#fefefe
| 463167 ||  || — || December 30, 2007 || Mount Lemmon || Mount Lemmon Survey || — || align=right data-sort-value="0.81" | 810 m || 
|-id=168 bgcolor=#fefefe
| 463168 ||  || — || November 24, 2003 || Kitt Peak || Spacewatch || — || align=right data-sort-value="0.64" | 640 m || 
|-id=169 bgcolor=#E9E9E9
| 463169 ||  || — || January 21, 2012 || Kitt Peak || Spacewatch || — || align=right data-sort-value="0.73" | 730 m || 
|-id=170 bgcolor=#fefefe
| 463170 ||  || — || January 21, 2012 || Kitt Peak || Spacewatch || — || align=right data-sort-value="0.81" | 810 m || 
|-id=171 bgcolor=#fefefe
| 463171 ||  || — || January 21, 2012 || Kitt Peak || Spacewatch || — || align=right data-sort-value="0.73" | 730 m || 
|-id=172 bgcolor=#fefefe
| 463172 ||  || — || October 12, 2007 || Kitt Peak || Spacewatch || MAS || align=right data-sort-value="0.51" | 510 m || 
|-id=173 bgcolor=#fefefe
| 463173 ||  || — || February 9, 2008 || Mount Lemmon || Mount Lemmon Survey || — || align=right | 1.1 km || 
|-id=174 bgcolor=#E9E9E9
| 463174 ||  || — || February 12, 2008 || Catalina || CSS || — || align=right | 2.5 km || 
|-id=175 bgcolor=#fefefe
| 463175 ||  || — || November 15, 2007 || Mount Lemmon || Mount Lemmon Survey || V || align=right data-sort-value="0.55" | 550 m || 
|-id=176 bgcolor=#fefefe
| 463176 ||  || — || November 7, 2007 || Kitt Peak || Spacewatch || — || align=right data-sort-value="0.58" | 580 m || 
|-id=177 bgcolor=#fefefe
| 463177 ||  || — || January 27, 2012 || Mount Lemmon || Mount Lemmon Survey || — || align=right data-sort-value="0.76" | 760 m || 
|-id=178 bgcolor=#fefefe
| 463178 ||  || — || November 6, 2007 || Kitt Peak || Spacewatch || — || align=right data-sort-value="0.69" | 690 m || 
|-id=179 bgcolor=#fefefe
| 463179 ||  || — || December 4, 2007 || Kitt Peak || Spacewatch || — || align=right data-sort-value="0.54" | 540 m || 
|-id=180 bgcolor=#fefefe
| 463180 ||  || — || December 5, 2007 || Mount Lemmon || Mount Lemmon Survey || NYS || align=right data-sort-value="0.51" | 510 m || 
|-id=181 bgcolor=#fefefe
| 463181 ||  || — || December 31, 2007 || Mount Lemmon || Mount Lemmon Survey || — || align=right data-sort-value="0.71" | 710 m || 
|-id=182 bgcolor=#fefefe
| 463182 ||  || — || January 21, 2012 || Kitt Peak || Spacewatch || — || align=right | 1.1 km || 
|-id=183 bgcolor=#fefefe
| 463183 ||  || — || December 5, 2007 || Kitt Peak || Spacewatch || MAS || align=right data-sort-value="0.52" | 520 m || 
|-id=184 bgcolor=#fefefe
| 463184 ||  || — || November 2, 2007 || Kitt Peak || Spacewatch || MAS || align=right data-sort-value="0.55" | 550 m || 
|-id=185 bgcolor=#fefefe
| 463185 ||  || — || December 15, 2007 || Kitt Peak || Spacewatch || — || align=right data-sort-value="0.83" | 830 m || 
|-id=186 bgcolor=#E9E9E9
| 463186 ||  || — || January 10, 2008 || Kitt Peak || Spacewatch || — || align=right data-sort-value="0.60" | 600 m || 
|-id=187 bgcolor=#fefefe
| 463187 ||  || — || October 29, 2003 || Kitt Peak || Spacewatch || — || align=right data-sort-value="0.67" | 670 m || 
|-id=188 bgcolor=#E9E9E9
| 463188 ||  || — || February 18, 2008 || Catalina || CSS || — || align=right | 2.1 km || 
|-id=189 bgcolor=#fefefe
| 463189 ||  || — || January 29, 2012 || Catalina || CSS || — || align=right data-sort-value="0.96" | 960 m || 
|-id=190 bgcolor=#fefefe
| 463190 ||  || — || January 30, 2012 || Kitt Peak || Spacewatch || — || align=right data-sort-value="0.75" | 750 m || 
|-id=191 bgcolor=#fefefe
| 463191 ||  || — || January 20, 2012 || Kitt Peak || Spacewatch || V || align=right data-sort-value="0.75" | 750 m || 
|-id=192 bgcolor=#fefefe
| 463192 ||  || — || August 12, 2006 || Haleakala || NEAT || — || align=right data-sort-value="0.74" | 740 m || 
|-id=193 bgcolor=#fefefe
| 463193 ||  || — || January 13, 2008 || Kitt Peak || Spacewatch || — || align=right data-sort-value="0.68" | 680 m || 
|-id=194 bgcolor=#E9E9E9
| 463194 ||  || — || January 21, 2012 || Catalina || CSS || — || align=right | 1.7 km || 
|-id=195 bgcolor=#fefefe
| 463195 ||  || — || February 3, 2009 || Kitt Peak || Spacewatch || — || align=right data-sort-value="0.78" | 780 m || 
|-id=196 bgcolor=#fefefe
| 463196 ||  || — || August 19, 2006 || Kitt Peak || Spacewatch || — || align=right | 1.1 km || 
|-id=197 bgcolor=#fefefe
| 463197 ||  || — || November 17, 2007 || Kitt Peak || Spacewatch || NYS || align=right data-sort-value="0.56" | 560 m || 
|-id=198 bgcolor=#fefefe
| 463198 ||  || — || March 31, 2009 || Mount Lemmon || Mount Lemmon Survey || — || align=right data-sort-value="0.95" | 950 m || 
|-id=199 bgcolor=#fefefe
| 463199 ||  || — || January 26, 2012 || Mount Lemmon || Mount Lemmon Survey || — || align=right data-sort-value="0.64" | 640 m || 
|-id=200 bgcolor=#fefefe
| 463200 ||  || — || December 30, 2007 || Mount Lemmon || Mount Lemmon Survey || — || align=right data-sort-value="0.63" | 630 m || 
|}

463201–463300 

|-bgcolor=#fefefe
| 463201 ||  || — || March 11, 2005 || Mount Lemmon || Mount Lemmon Survey || — || align=right data-sort-value="0.66" | 660 m || 
|-id=202 bgcolor=#fefefe
| 463202 ||  || — || September 21, 2003 || Haleakala || NEAT || — || align=right data-sort-value="0.80" | 800 m || 
|-id=203 bgcolor=#fefefe
| 463203 ||  || — || January 26, 2012 || Mount Lemmon || Mount Lemmon Survey || — || align=right data-sort-value="0.92" | 920 m || 
|-id=204 bgcolor=#fefefe
| 463204 ||  || — || April 2, 2009 || Kitt Peak || Spacewatch || (2076) || align=right data-sort-value="0.72" | 720 m || 
|-id=205 bgcolor=#fefefe
| 463205 ||  || — || October 18, 2003 || Kitt Peak || Spacewatch || NYS || align=right data-sort-value="0.63" | 630 m || 
|-id=206 bgcolor=#E9E9E9
| 463206 ||  || — || October 16, 2006 || Kitt Peak || Spacewatch || — || align=right data-sort-value="0.88" | 880 m || 
|-id=207 bgcolor=#fefefe
| 463207 ||  || — || February 9, 2005 || Mount Lemmon || Mount Lemmon Survey || — || align=right data-sort-value="0.69" | 690 m || 
|-id=208 bgcolor=#E9E9E9
| 463208 ||  || — || February 13, 2012 || Kitt Peak || Spacewatch || — || align=right | 1.0 km || 
|-id=209 bgcolor=#E9E9E9
| 463209 ||  || — || February 8, 2008 || Mount Lemmon || Mount Lemmon Survey || — || align=right | 1.4 km || 
|-id=210 bgcolor=#E9E9E9
| 463210 ||  || — || December 17, 2007 || Kitt Peak || Spacewatch || — || align=right | 1.8 km || 
|-id=211 bgcolor=#fefefe
| 463211 ||  || — || December 19, 2007 || Kitt Peak || Spacewatch || — || align=right data-sort-value="0.62" | 620 m || 
|-id=212 bgcolor=#fefefe
| 463212 ||  || — || July 26, 2006 || Oukaïmeden || NEAT || — || align=right | 1.0 km || 
|-id=213 bgcolor=#fefefe
| 463213 ||  || — || May 10, 2005 || Kitt Peak || Spacewatch || NYS || align=right data-sort-value="0.58" | 580 m || 
|-id=214 bgcolor=#fefefe
| 463214 ||  || — || February 11, 2012 || Mount Lemmon || Mount Lemmon Survey || — || align=right data-sort-value="0.65" | 650 m || 
|-id=215 bgcolor=#E9E9E9
| 463215 ||  || — || February 22, 2012 || Kitt Peak || Spacewatch || — || align=right | 1.3 km || 
|-id=216 bgcolor=#FFC2E0
| 463216 ||  || — || February 23, 2012 || Catalina || CSS || AMO || align=right data-sort-value="0.77" | 770 m || 
|-id=217 bgcolor=#fefefe
| 463217 ||  || — || December 16, 2007 || Mount Lemmon || Mount Lemmon Survey || V || align=right data-sort-value="0.78" | 780 m || 
|-id=218 bgcolor=#E9E9E9
| 463218 ||  || — || February 9, 2008 || Kitt Peak || Spacewatch || — || align=right data-sort-value="0.74" | 740 m || 
|-id=219 bgcolor=#E9E9E9
| 463219 ||  || — || February 23, 2012 || Kitt Peak || Spacewatch || — || align=right | 1.2 km || 
|-id=220 bgcolor=#fefefe
| 463220 ||  || — || February 28, 2008 || Mount Lemmon || Mount Lemmon Survey || critical || align=right data-sort-value="0.71" | 710 m || 
|-id=221 bgcolor=#fefefe
| 463221 ||  || — || December 16, 2007 || Mount Lemmon || Mount Lemmon Survey || — || align=right data-sort-value="0.79" | 790 m || 
|-id=222 bgcolor=#fefefe
| 463222 ||  || — || February 10, 2008 || Kitt Peak || Spacewatch || — || align=right data-sort-value="0.73" | 730 m || 
|-id=223 bgcolor=#E9E9E9
| 463223 ||  || — || February 22, 2012 || Kitt Peak || Spacewatch || — || align=right data-sort-value="0.93" | 930 m || 
|-id=224 bgcolor=#E9E9E9
| 463224 ||  || — || February 22, 2012 || Catalina || CSS || — || align=right | 1.5 km || 
|-id=225 bgcolor=#fefefe
| 463225 ||  || — || December 30, 2007 || Mount Lemmon || Mount Lemmon Survey || MAS || align=right data-sort-value="0.66" | 660 m || 
|-id=226 bgcolor=#E9E9E9
| 463226 ||  || — || February 21, 2012 || Kitt Peak || Spacewatch || — || align=right | 1.6 km || 
|-id=227 bgcolor=#fefefe
| 463227 ||  || — || February 23, 2012 || Mount Lemmon || Mount Lemmon Survey || NYS || align=right data-sort-value="0.65" | 650 m || 
|-id=228 bgcolor=#fefefe
| 463228 ||  || — || January 18, 2012 || Kitt Peak || Spacewatch || — || align=right data-sort-value="0.85" | 850 m || 
|-id=229 bgcolor=#fefefe
| 463229 ||  || — || January 19, 2008 || Kitt Peak || Spacewatch || — || align=right data-sort-value="0.65" | 650 m || 
|-id=230 bgcolor=#fefefe
| 463230 ||  || — || January 21, 2012 || Kitt Peak || Spacewatch || — || align=right data-sort-value="0.88" | 880 m || 
|-id=231 bgcolor=#fefefe
| 463231 ||  || — || December 4, 2007 || Kitt Peak || Spacewatch || NYS || align=right data-sort-value="0.61" | 610 m || 
|-id=232 bgcolor=#E9E9E9
| 463232 ||  || — || March 1, 2008 || Kitt Peak || Spacewatch || — || align=right data-sort-value="0.98" | 980 m || 
|-id=233 bgcolor=#fefefe
| 463233 ||  || — || March 19, 2001 || Socorro || LINEAR || — || align=right | 1.1 km || 
|-id=234 bgcolor=#fefefe
| 463234 ||  || — || February 22, 2012 || Kitt Peak || Spacewatch || — || align=right data-sort-value="0.73" | 730 m || 
|-id=235 bgcolor=#fefefe
| 463235 ||  || — || January 19, 2004 || Kitt Peak || Spacewatch || NYS || align=right data-sort-value="0.49" | 490 m || 
|-id=236 bgcolor=#E9E9E9
| 463236 ||  || — || March 14, 2012 || Kitt Peak || Spacewatch || — || align=right data-sort-value="0.86" | 860 m || 
|-id=237 bgcolor=#E9E9E9
| 463237 ||  || — || March 8, 2008 || Kitt Peak || Spacewatch || — || align=right | 1.3 km || 
|-id=238 bgcolor=#fefefe
| 463238 ||  || — || January 10, 2008 || Mount Lemmon || Mount Lemmon Survey || — || align=right data-sort-value="0.81" | 810 m || 
|-id=239 bgcolor=#E9E9E9
| 463239 ||  || — || March 30, 2008 || Catalina || CSS || — || align=right data-sort-value="0.87" | 870 m || 
|-id=240 bgcolor=#FA8072
| 463240 || 2012 FC || — || May 14, 2008 || Piszkéstető || Spacewatch || — || align=right | 1.4 km || 
|-id=241 bgcolor=#E9E9E9
| 463241 ||  || — || October 13, 2010 || Mount Lemmon || Mount Lemmon Survey || — || align=right data-sort-value="0.84" | 840 m || 
|-id=242 bgcolor=#E9E9E9
| 463242 ||  || — || September 29, 2005 || Mount Lemmon || Mount Lemmon Survey || — || align=right | 1.4 km || 
|-id=243 bgcolor=#E9E9E9
| 463243 ||  || — || September 17, 2006 || Kitt Peak || Spacewatch || (5) || align=right data-sort-value="0.64" | 640 m || 
|-id=244 bgcolor=#E9E9E9
| 463244 ||  || — || March 28, 2008 || Mount Lemmon || Mount Lemmon Survey || — || align=right data-sort-value="0.79" | 790 m || 
|-id=245 bgcolor=#E9E9E9
| 463245 ||  || — || March 2, 2008 || Mount Lemmon || Mount Lemmon Survey || — || align=right data-sort-value="0.75" | 750 m || 
|-id=246 bgcolor=#E9E9E9
| 463246 ||  || — || February 22, 2012 || Kitt Peak || Spacewatch || — || align=right | 1.8 km || 
|-id=247 bgcolor=#E9E9E9
| 463247 ||  || — || March 1, 2008 || Kitt Peak || Spacewatch || — || align=right | 1.6 km || 
|-id=248 bgcolor=#E9E9E9
| 463248 ||  || — || February 26, 2012 || Mount Lemmon || Mount Lemmon Survey || — || align=right | 1.6 km || 
|-id=249 bgcolor=#E9E9E9
| 463249 ||  || — || August 28, 2009 || Kitt Peak || Spacewatch || — || align=right | 1.3 km || 
|-id=250 bgcolor=#E9E9E9
| 463250 ||  || — || March 10, 2008 || Mount Lemmon || Mount Lemmon Survey || — || align=right | 1.0 km || 
|-id=251 bgcolor=#E9E9E9
| 463251 ||  || — || March 31, 2008 || Mount Lemmon || Mount Lemmon Survey || EUN || align=right data-sort-value="0.89" | 890 m || 
|-id=252 bgcolor=#E9E9E9
| 463252 ||  || — || March 13, 2008 || Kitt Peak || Spacewatch || — || align=right data-sort-value="0.69" | 690 m || 
|-id=253 bgcolor=#E9E9E9
| 463253 ||  || — || November 6, 2010 || Mount Lemmon || Mount Lemmon Survey || — || align=right | 1.1 km || 
|-id=254 bgcolor=#E9E9E9
| 463254 ||  || — || May 5, 2008 || Mount Lemmon || Mount Lemmon Survey || — || align=right | 1.4 km || 
|-id=255 bgcolor=#E9E9E9
| 463255 ||  || — || April 14, 2008 || Kitt Peak || Spacewatch || — || align=right | 1.5 km || 
|-id=256 bgcolor=#E9E9E9
| 463256 ||  || — || March 13, 2008 || Kitt Peak || Spacewatch || — || align=right | 1.6 km || 
|-id=257 bgcolor=#FFC2E0
| 463257 ||  || — || April 2, 2012 || Haleakala || Pan-STARRS || AMO || align=right data-sort-value="0.68" | 680 m || 
|-id=258 bgcolor=#E9E9E9
| 463258 ||  || — || January 3, 2011 || Mount Lemmon || Mount Lemmon Survey || — || align=right | 1.9 km || 
|-id=259 bgcolor=#E9E9E9
| 463259 ||  || — || April 10, 2012 || Kitt Peak || Spacewatch || — || align=right | 1.7 km || 
|-id=260 bgcolor=#E9E9E9
| 463260 ||  || — || March 4, 2012 || Mount Lemmon || Mount Lemmon Survey || EUN || align=right | 1.1 km || 
|-id=261 bgcolor=#E9E9E9
| 463261 ||  || — || September 16, 2009 || Mount Lemmon || Mount Lemmon Survey || — || align=right | 1.6 km || 
|-id=262 bgcolor=#E9E9E9
| 463262 ||  || — || July 15, 2004 || Siding Spring || SSS || — || align=right | 1.4 km || 
|-id=263 bgcolor=#E9E9E9
| 463263 ||  || — || October 20, 1993 || Kitt Peak || Spacewatch || — || align=right | 1.2 km || 
|-id=264 bgcolor=#E9E9E9
| 463264 ||  || — || May 28, 2008 || Mount Lemmon || Mount Lemmon Survey || — || align=right data-sort-value="0.92" | 920 m || 
|-id=265 bgcolor=#fefefe
| 463265 ||  || — || January 30, 2008 || Mount Lemmon || Mount Lemmon Survey || — || align=right data-sort-value="0.67" | 670 m || 
|-id=266 bgcolor=#E9E9E9
| 463266 ||  || — || March 27, 2012 || Mount Lemmon || Mount Lemmon Survey || — || align=right | 2.3 km || 
|-id=267 bgcolor=#E9E9E9
| 463267 ||  || — || February 9, 2002 || Kitt Peak || Spacewatch || — || align=right | 2.7 km || 
|-id=268 bgcolor=#E9E9E9
| 463268 ||  || — || January 11, 2011 || Kitt Peak || Spacewatch || — || align=right | 3.2 km || 
|-id=269 bgcolor=#fefefe
| 463269 ||  || — || October 21, 1995 || Kitt Peak || Spacewatch || — || align=right data-sort-value="0.88" | 880 m || 
|-id=270 bgcolor=#E9E9E9
| 463270 ||  || — || October 10, 2004 || Kitt Peak || Spacewatch || — || align=right | 1.3 km || 
|-id=271 bgcolor=#E9E9E9
| 463271 ||  || — || April 11, 2008 || Kitt Peak || Spacewatch || — || align=right data-sort-value="0.81" | 810 m || 
|-id=272 bgcolor=#E9E9E9
| 463272 ||  || — || January 19, 2012 || Mount Lemmon || Mount Lemmon Survey || MAR || align=right | 1.6 km || 
|-id=273 bgcolor=#E9E9E9
| 463273 ||  || — || November 11, 2009 || Kitt Peak || Spacewatch || JUN || align=right | 1.1 km || 
|-id=274 bgcolor=#E9E9E9
| 463274 ||  || — || October 14, 2009 || Mount Lemmon || Mount Lemmon Survey || — || align=right | 1.8 km || 
|-id=275 bgcolor=#E9E9E9
| 463275 ||  || — || December 24, 2005 || Kitt Peak || Spacewatch || — || align=right | 2.2 km || 
|-id=276 bgcolor=#E9E9E9
| 463276 ||  || — || December 6, 2010 || Mount Lemmon || Mount Lemmon Survey || — || align=right | 2.3 km || 
|-id=277 bgcolor=#d6d6d6
| 463277 ||  || — || April 13, 2012 || Kitt Peak || Spacewatch || EOS || align=right | 2.5 km || 
|-id=278 bgcolor=#E9E9E9
| 463278 ||  || — || December 10, 2001 || Kitt Peak || Spacewatch || — || align=right | 1.9 km || 
|-id=279 bgcolor=#E9E9E9
| 463279 ||  || — || January 2, 2012 || Mount Lemmon || Mount Lemmon Survey || — || align=right | 1.4 km || 
|-id=280 bgcolor=#E9E9E9
| 463280 ||  || — || September 7, 2008 || Catalina || CSS || — || align=right | 2.3 km || 
|-id=281 bgcolor=#E9E9E9
| 463281 ||  || — || March 27, 2012 || Mount Lemmon || Mount Lemmon Survey || — || align=right | 1.2 km || 
|-id=282 bgcolor=#FFC2E0
| 463282 ||  || — || April 22, 2012 || Catalina || CSS || APO +1km || align=right | 1.4 km || 
|-id=283 bgcolor=#E9E9E9
| 463283 ||  || — || March 12, 2007 || Mount Lemmon || Mount Lemmon Survey || EUN || align=right | 1.2 km || 
|-id=284 bgcolor=#E9E9E9
| 463284 ||  || — || October 15, 2009 || Kitt Peak || Spacewatch || — || align=right | 2.1 km || 
|-id=285 bgcolor=#E9E9E9
| 463285 ||  || — || March 27, 2012 || Mount Lemmon || Mount Lemmon Survey || MAR || align=right | 1.2 km || 
|-id=286 bgcolor=#E9E9E9
| 463286 ||  || — || April 20, 2012 || Kitt Peak || Spacewatch || — || align=right | 1.7 km || 
|-id=287 bgcolor=#E9E9E9
| 463287 ||  || — || September 22, 2009 || Mount Lemmon || Mount Lemmon Survey || — || align=right | 1.1 km || 
|-id=288 bgcolor=#E9E9E9
| 463288 ||  || — || January 27, 2007 || Mount Lemmon || Mount Lemmon Survey || JUN || align=right data-sort-value="0.87" | 870 m || 
|-id=289 bgcolor=#E9E9E9
| 463289 ||  || — || March 14, 2007 || Mount Lemmon || Mount Lemmon Survey || — || align=right | 1.9 km || 
|-id=290 bgcolor=#E9E9E9
| 463290 ||  || — || October 8, 2004 || Kitt Peak || Spacewatch || — || align=right | 1.2 km || 
|-id=291 bgcolor=#d6d6d6
| 463291 ||  || — || April 25, 2012 || Kitt Peak || Spacewatch || EOS || align=right | 2.2 km || 
|-id=292 bgcolor=#E9E9E9
| 463292 ||  || — || April 1, 2012 || Mount Lemmon || Mount Lemmon Survey || — || align=right | 1.2 km || 
|-id=293 bgcolor=#FA8072
| 463293 ||  || — || December 7, 2002 || Desert Eagle || W. K. Y. Yeung || — || align=right | 2.3 km || 
|-id=294 bgcolor=#d6d6d6
| 463294 ||  || — || April 18, 2012 || Catalina || CSS || NAE || align=right | 3.0 km || 
|-id=295 bgcolor=#E9E9E9
| 463295 ||  || — || December 27, 2006 || Mount Lemmon || Mount Lemmon Survey || — || align=right | 1.4 km || 
|-id=296 bgcolor=#E9E9E9
| 463296 ||  || — || May 3, 2008 || Mount Lemmon || Mount Lemmon Survey || — || align=right | 1.2 km || 
|-id=297 bgcolor=#E9E9E9
| 463297 ||  || — || September 17, 2009 || Kitt Peak || Spacewatch || EUN || align=right | 1.2 km || 
|-id=298 bgcolor=#E9E9E9
| 463298 ||  || — || January 4, 2011 || Mount Lemmon || Mount Lemmon Survey || — || align=right data-sort-value="0.96" | 960 m || 
|-id=299 bgcolor=#E9E9E9
| 463299 ||  || — || September 3, 2010 || Mount Lemmon || Mount Lemmon Survey || — || align=right | 1.6 km || 
|-id=300 bgcolor=#E9E9E9
| 463300 ||  || — || May 29, 2008 || Mount Lemmon || Mount Lemmon Survey || — || align=right | 2.2 km || 
|}

463301–463400 

|-bgcolor=#E9E9E9
| 463301 ||  || — || March 26, 2003 || Palomar || NEAT || — || align=right | 1.3 km || 
|-id=302 bgcolor=#E9E9E9
| 463302 ||  || — || April 29, 2012 || Kitt Peak || Spacewatch || — || align=right | 1.3 km || 
|-id=303 bgcolor=#E9E9E9
| 463303 ||  || — || January 10, 2011 || Mount Lemmon || Mount Lemmon Survey || — || align=right | 2.6 km || 
|-id=304 bgcolor=#E9E9E9
| 463304 ||  || — || April 29, 2012 || Kitt Peak || Spacewatch || — || align=right data-sort-value="0.92" | 920 m || 
|-id=305 bgcolor=#d6d6d6
| 463305 ||  || — || April 28, 2012 || Mount Lemmon || Mount Lemmon Survey || EOS || align=right | 2.1 km || 
|-id=306 bgcolor=#E9E9E9
| 463306 ||  || — || March 14, 2007 || Kitt Peak || Spacewatch || — || align=right | 2.5 km || 
|-id=307 bgcolor=#E9E9E9
| 463307 ||  || — || October 25, 2005 || Kitt Peak || Spacewatch || — || align=right | 1.2 km || 
|-id=308 bgcolor=#E9E9E9
| 463308 ||  || — || October 1, 2005 || Mount Lemmon || Mount Lemmon Survey || — || align=right | 1.4 km || 
|-id=309 bgcolor=#E9E9E9
| 463309 ||  || — || September 6, 2008 || Catalina || CSS || — || align=right | 2.9 km || 
|-id=310 bgcolor=#E9E9E9
| 463310 ||  || — || October 30, 2005 || Kitt Peak || Spacewatch || — || align=right | 1.5 km || 
|-id=311 bgcolor=#E9E9E9
| 463311 ||  || — || January 2, 2011 || Mount Lemmon || Mount Lemmon Survey || EUN || align=right | 1.3 km || 
|-id=312 bgcolor=#E9E9E9
| 463312 ||  || — || May 14, 2012 || Mount Lemmon || Mount Lemmon Survey || — || align=right data-sort-value="0.94" | 940 m || 
|-id=313 bgcolor=#d6d6d6
| 463313 ||  || — || December 20, 2009 || Catalina || CSS || — || align=right | 3.8 km || 
|-id=314 bgcolor=#E9E9E9
| 463314 ||  || — || April 28, 2012 || Mount Lemmon || Mount Lemmon Survey || GEF || align=right | 1.1 km || 
|-id=315 bgcolor=#E9E9E9
| 463315 ||  || — || December 27, 2006 || Mount Lemmon || Mount Lemmon Survey || — || align=right | 1.2 km || 
|-id=316 bgcolor=#E9E9E9
| 463316 ||  || — || April 24, 2008 || Kitt Peak || Spacewatch || — || align=right data-sort-value="0.86" | 860 m || 
|-id=317 bgcolor=#E9E9E9
| 463317 ||  || — || September 15, 2009 || Kitt Peak || Spacewatch || — || align=right | 1.3 km || 
|-id=318 bgcolor=#E9E9E9
| 463318 ||  || — || March 23, 2003 || Apache Point || SDSS || — || align=right | 1.2 km || 
|-id=319 bgcolor=#E9E9E9
| 463319 ||  || — || October 25, 2005 || Mount Lemmon || Mount Lemmon Survey || — || align=right | 1.7 km || 
|-id=320 bgcolor=#E9E9E9
| 463320 ||  || — || October 14, 2009 || Mount Lemmon || Mount Lemmon Survey || — || align=right | 2.6 km || 
|-id=321 bgcolor=#E9E9E9
| 463321 ||  || — || May 1, 2012 || Mount Lemmon || Mount Lemmon Survey || — || align=right | 1.9 km || 
|-id=322 bgcolor=#E9E9E9
| 463322 ||  || — || May 14, 2008 || Mount Lemmon || Mount Lemmon Survey || — || align=right | 1.1 km || 
|-id=323 bgcolor=#E9E9E9
| 463323 ||  || — || March 29, 2012 || Kitt Peak || Spacewatch || — || align=right data-sort-value="0.89" | 890 m || 
|-id=324 bgcolor=#E9E9E9
| 463324 ||  || — || March 29, 2012 || Kitt Peak || Spacewatch || MRX || align=right data-sort-value="0.85" | 850 m || 
|-id=325 bgcolor=#E9E9E9
| 463325 ||  || — || April 20, 2012 || Mount Lemmon || Mount Lemmon Survey || — || align=right | 1.2 km || 
|-id=326 bgcolor=#E9E9E9
| 463326 ||  || — || October 25, 2005 || Kitt Peak || Spacewatch || — || align=right | 1.1 km || 
|-id=327 bgcolor=#E9E9E9
| 463327 ||  || — || January 18, 1999 || Kitt Peak || Spacewatch || — || align=right | 1.3 km || 
|-id=328 bgcolor=#E9E9E9
| 463328 ||  || — || November 30, 2010 || Mount Lemmon || Mount Lemmon Survey || ADE || align=right | 1.7 km || 
|-id=329 bgcolor=#E9E9E9
| 463329 ||  || — || August 26, 2008 || Socorro || LINEAR || — || align=right | 2.6 km || 
|-id=330 bgcolor=#E9E9E9
| 463330 ||  || — || May 19, 2012 || Catalina || CSS || — || align=right | 1.6 km || 
|-id=331 bgcolor=#d6d6d6
| 463331 ||  || — || October 2, 2003 || Kitt Peak || Spacewatch || — || align=right | 3.7 km || 
|-id=332 bgcolor=#E9E9E9
| 463332 ||  || — || January 28, 2007 || Kitt Peak || Spacewatch || — || align=right | 1.3 km || 
|-id=333 bgcolor=#E9E9E9
| 463333 ||  || — || May 20, 2012 || Mount Lemmon || Mount Lemmon Survey || EUN || align=right | 1.3 km || 
|-id=334 bgcolor=#E9E9E9
| 463334 ||  || — || May 30, 2008 || Mount Lemmon || Mount Lemmon Survey || — || align=right | 1.5 km || 
|-id=335 bgcolor=#E9E9E9
| 463335 ||  || — || May 19, 2012 || Mount Lemmon || Mount Lemmon Survey || — || align=right | 2.0 km || 
|-id=336 bgcolor=#d6d6d6
| 463336 ||  || — || May 27, 2012 || Mount Lemmon || Mount Lemmon Survey || — || align=right | 3.2 km || 
|-id=337 bgcolor=#d6d6d6
| 463337 ||  || — || March 28, 2010 || WISE || WISE || — || align=right | 4.3 km || 
|-id=338 bgcolor=#d6d6d6
| 463338 ||  || — || June 14, 2012 || Mount Lemmon || Mount Lemmon Survey || — || align=right | 3.3 km || 
|-id=339 bgcolor=#d6d6d6
| 463339 ||  || — || April 1, 2011 || Mount Lemmon || Mount Lemmon Survey || — || align=right | 3.4 km || 
|-id=340 bgcolor=#E9E9E9
| 463340 ||  || — || September 19, 2003 || Kitt Peak || Spacewatch || — || align=right | 2.2 km || 
|-id=341 bgcolor=#d6d6d6
| 463341 ||  || — || August 17, 2006 || Palomar || NEAT || — || align=right | 3.6 km || 
|-id=342 bgcolor=#d6d6d6
| 463342 ||  || — || March 12, 2005 || Mount Lemmon || Mount Lemmon Survey || EOS || align=right | 2.0 km || 
|-id=343 bgcolor=#d6d6d6
| 463343 ||  || — || August 11, 2012 || Siding Spring || SSS || — || align=right | 3.6 km || 
|-id=344 bgcolor=#d6d6d6
| 463344 ||  || — || August 10, 2012 || Kitt Peak || Spacewatch || — || align=right | 3.4 km || 
|-id=345 bgcolor=#d6d6d6
| 463345 ||  || — || October 7, 2007 || Mount Lemmon || Mount Lemmon Survey || THM || align=right | 2.2 km || 
|-id=346 bgcolor=#d6d6d6
| 463346 ||  || — || September 14, 2007 || Mount Lemmon || Mount Lemmon Survey || THM || align=right | 2.0 km || 
|-id=347 bgcolor=#d6d6d6
| 463347 ||  || — || March 9, 2011 || Kitt Peak || Spacewatch || Tj (2.99) || align=right | 3.6 km || 
|-id=348 bgcolor=#d6d6d6
| 463348 ||  || — || March 12, 2011 || Mount Lemmon || Mount Lemmon Survey || THB || align=right | 4.0 km || 
|-id=349 bgcolor=#d6d6d6
| 463349 ||  || — || August 22, 2006 || Palomar || NEAT || — || align=right | 3.4 km || 
|-id=350 bgcolor=#d6d6d6
| 463350 ||  || — || October 8, 2007 || Catalina || CSS || — || align=right | 3.1 km || 
|-id=351 bgcolor=#d6d6d6
| 463351 ||  || — || April 10, 2005 || Kitt Peak || Spacewatch || — || align=right | 2.9 km || 
|-id=352 bgcolor=#FA8072
| 463352 ||  || — || October 16, 2007 || Catalina || CSS || H || align=right data-sort-value="0.59" | 590 m || 
|-id=353 bgcolor=#d6d6d6
| 463353 ||  || — || March 4, 2005 || Kitt Peak || Spacewatch || — || align=right | 2.3 km || 
|-id=354 bgcolor=#d6d6d6
| 463354 ||  || — || July 29, 2006 || Siding Spring || SSS || — || align=right | 4.1 km || 
|-id=355 bgcolor=#d6d6d6
| 463355 ||  || — || April 26, 2006 || Cerro Tololo || M. W. Buie || — || align=right | 2.2 km || 
|-id=356 bgcolor=#d6d6d6
| 463356 ||  || — || October 12, 2007 || Mount Lemmon || Mount Lemmon Survey || — || align=right | 3.2 km || 
|-id=357 bgcolor=#d6d6d6
| 463357 ||  || — || May 19, 2005 || Mount Lemmon || Mount Lemmon Survey || — || align=right | 3.1 km || 
|-id=358 bgcolor=#d6d6d6
| 463358 ||  || — || October 2, 2006 || Mount Lemmon || Mount Lemmon Survey || SYL7:4 || align=right | 3.8 km || 
|-id=359 bgcolor=#FA8072
| 463359 ||  || — || September 14, 2012 || Catalina || CSS || H || align=right data-sort-value="0.62" | 620 m || 
|-id=360 bgcolor=#FFC2E0
| 463360 ||  || — || October 4, 2012 || Haleakala || Pan-STARRS || AMO || align=right data-sort-value="0.27" | 270 m || 
|-id=361 bgcolor=#fefefe
| 463361 ||  || — || September 13, 2007 || Catalina || CSS || H || align=right data-sort-value="0.50" | 500 m || 
|-id=362 bgcolor=#d6d6d6
| 463362 ||  || — || September 15, 2012 || ESA OGS || ESA OGS || — || align=right | 3.1 km || 
|-id=363 bgcolor=#d6d6d6
| 463363 ||  || — || April 12, 2005 || Mount Lemmon || Mount Lemmon Survey || — || align=right | 3.5 km || 
|-id=364 bgcolor=#d6d6d6
| 463364 ||  || — || June 28, 2006 || Siding Spring || SSS || — || align=right | 3.1 km || 
|-id=365 bgcolor=#d6d6d6
| 463365 ||  || — || May 23, 2010 || WISE || WISE || — || align=right | 4.5 km || 
|-id=366 bgcolor=#d6d6d6
| 463366 ||  || — || April 22, 2011 || Kitt Peak || Spacewatch || — || align=right | 2.6 km || 
|-id=367 bgcolor=#d6d6d6
| 463367 ||  || — || October 17, 2006 || Kitt Peak || Spacewatch || — || align=right | 3.2 km || 
|-id=368 bgcolor=#C7FF8F
| 463368 ||  || — || November 14, 2012 || Mount Graham || K. Černis, R. P. Boyle || centaurcritical || align=right | 154 km || 
|-id=369 bgcolor=#fefefe
| 463369 ||  || — || November 19, 2004 || Catalina || CSS || H || align=right data-sort-value="0.80" | 800 m || 
|-id=370 bgcolor=#d6d6d6
| 463370 ||  || — || October 21, 2012 || Haleakala || Pan-STARRS || — || align=right | 3.3 km || 
|-id=371 bgcolor=#fefefe
| 463371 ||  || — || April 26, 2003 || Kitt Peak || Spacewatch || H || align=right data-sort-value="0.77" | 770 m || 
|-id=372 bgcolor=#fefefe
| 463372 ||  || — || January 11, 2008 || Mount Lemmon || Mount Lemmon Survey || H || align=right data-sort-value="0.76" | 760 m || 
|-id=373 bgcolor=#fefefe
| 463373 ||  || — || November 4, 2007 || Mount Lemmon || Mount Lemmon Survey || H || align=right data-sort-value="0.64" | 640 m || 
|-id=374 bgcolor=#fefefe
| 463374 ||  || — || June 5, 2011 || Mount Lemmon || Mount Lemmon Survey || H || align=right data-sort-value="0.81" | 810 m || 
|-id=375 bgcolor=#fefefe
| 463375 ||  || — || December 13, 2004 || Campo Imperatore || CINEOS || H || align=right data-sort-value="0.67" | 670 m || 
|-id=376 bgcolor=#fefefe
| 463376 ||  || — || January 10, 2013 || Catalina || CSS || H || align=right data-sort-value="0.78" | 780 m || 
|-id=377 bgcolor=#fefefe
| 463377 ||  || — || January 16, 2008 || Kitt Peak || Spacewatch || H || align=right data-sort-value="0.80" | 800 m || 
|-id=378 bgcolor=#d6d6d6
| 463378 ||  || — || January 18, 2013 || Mount Lemmon || Mount Lemmon Survey || — || align=right | 2.8 km || 
|-id=379 bgcolor=#fefefe
| 463379 ||  || — || June 29, 2003 || Socorro || LINEAR || H || align=right data-sort-value="0.75" | 750 m || 
|-id=380 bgcolor=#FFC2E0
| 463380 ||  || — || April 6, 2010 || Mount Lemmon || Mount Lemmon Survey || AMOslow || align=right data-sort-value="0.56" | 560 m || 
|-id=381 bgcolor=#E9E9E9
| 463381 ||  || — || January 9, 2013 || Kitt Peak || Spacewatch || — || align=right | 1.7 km || 
|-id=382 bgcolor=#fefefe
| 463382 ||  || — || January 18, 2013 || Kitt Peak || Spacewatch || — || align=right data-sort-value="0.70" | 700 m || 
|-id=383 bgcolor=#fefefe
| 463383 ||  || — || May 7, 2005 || Catalina || CSS || H || align=right data-sort-value="0.76" | 760 m || 
|-id=384 bgcolor=#fefefe
| 463384 ||  || — || January 17, 2013 || Catalina || CSS || H || align=right data-sort-value="0.85" | 850 m || 
|-id=385 bgcolor=#fefefe
| 463385 ||  || — || September 20, 2006 || Nogales || LONEOS || H || align=right data-sort-value="0.79" | 790 m || 
|-id=386 bgcolor=#fefefe
| 463386 ||  || — || August 29, 1995 || Kitt Peak || Spacewatch || H || align=right data-sort-value="0.68" | 680 m || 
|-id=387 bgcolor=#FFC2E0
| 463387 ||  || — || February 8, 2013 || Haleakala || Pan-STARRS || APOPHA || align=right data-sort-value="0.76" | 760 m || 
|-id=388 bgcolor=#fefefe
| 463388 ||  || — || February 11, 2013 || Catalina || CSS || H || align=right data-sort-value="0.61" | 610 m || 
|-id=389 bgcolor=#fefefe
| 463389 ||  || — || August 3, 2011 || Haleakala || Pan-STARRS || H || align=right data-sort-value="0.61" | 610 m || 
|-id=390 bgcolor=#FA8072
| 463390 ||  || — || March 8, 2013 || Haleakala || Pan-STARRS || H || align=right data-sort-value="0.66" | 660 m || 
|-id=391 bgcolor=#fefefe
| 463391 ||  || — || March 2, 2006 || Kitt Peak || Spacewatch || — || align=right data-sort-value="0.67" | 670 m || 
|-id=392 bgcolor=#fefefe
| 463392 ||  || — || March 12, 2013 || Kitt Peak || Spacewatch || — || align=right data-sort-value="0.80" | 800 m || 
|-id=393 bgcolor=#fefefe
| 463393 ||  || — || December 4, 2008 || Mount Lemmon || Mount Lemmon Survey || — || align=right data-sort-value="0.68" | 680 m || 
|-id=394 bgcolor=#fefefe
| 463394 ||  || — || December 3, 2008 || Mount Lemmon || Mount Lemmon Survey || — || align=right data-sort-value="0.57" | 570 m || 
|-id=395 bgcolor=#fefefe
| 463395 ||  || — || September 14, 2006 || Kitt Peak || Spacewatch || H || align=right data-sort-value="0.53" | 530 m || 
|-id=396 bgcolor=#fefefe
| 463396 ||  || — || April 7, 2013 || Mount Lemmon || Mount Lemmon Survey || — || align=right data-sort-value="0.69" | 690 m || 
|-id=397 bgcolor=#fefefe
| 463397 ||  || — || April 8, 2013 || Mount Lemmon || Mount Lemmon Survey || — || align=right data-sort-value="0.69" | 690 m || 
|-id=398 bgcolor=#fefefe
| 463398 ||  || — || November 18, 2008 || Kitt Peak || Spacewatch || — || align=right data-sort-value="0.59" | 590 m || 
|-id=399 bgcolor=#fefefe
| 463399 ||  || — || March 24, 2003 || Kitt Peak || Spacewatch || — || align=right data-sort-value="0.69" | 690 m || 
|-id=400 bgcolor=#fefefe
| 463400 ||  || — || May 17, 2010 || WISE || WISE || — || align=right data-sort-value="0.75" | 750 m || 
|}

463401–463500 

|-bgcolor=#fefefe
| 463401 ||  || — || April 11, 2013 || Mount Lemmon || Mount Lemmon Survey || V || align=right data-sort-value="0.58" | 580 m || 
|-id=402 bgcolor=#fefefe
| 463402 ||  || — || October 24, 2011 || Kitt Peak || Spacewatch || — || align=right data-sort-value="0.56" | 560 m || 
|-id=403 bgcolor=#fefefe
| 463403 ||  || — || March 13, 2013 || Kitt Peak || Spacewatch || — || align=right data-sort-value="0.79" | 790 m || 
|-id=404 bgcolor=#fefefe
| 463404 ||  || — || October 17, 2003 || Socorro || LINEAR || — || align=right | 1.8 km || 
|-id=405 bgcolor=#fefefe
| 463405 ||  || — || February 16, 2013 || Mount Lemmon || Mount Lemmon Survey || — || align=right data-sort-value="0.83" | 830 m || 
|-id=406 bgcolor=#fefefe
| 463406 ||  || — || April 18, 2013 || Kitt Peak || Spacewatch || — || align=right data-sort-value="0.67" | 670 m || 
|-id=407 bgcolor=#fefefe
| 463407 ||  || — || August 10, 2010 || XuYi || PMO NEO || — || align=right data-sort-value="0.73" | 730 m || 
|-id=408 bgcolor=#fefefe
| 463408 ||  || — || September 23, 2011 || Kitt Peak || Spacewatch || — || align=right data-sort-value="0.59" | 590 m || 
|-id=409 bgcolor=#fefefe
| 463409 ||  || — || January 31, 2006 || Kitt Peak || Spacewatch || — || align=right data-sort-value="0.48" | 480 m || 
|-id=410 bgcolor=#fefefe
| 463410 ||  || — || October 18, 2011 || Kitt Peak || Spacewatch || — || align=right data-sort-value="0.60" | 600 m || 
|-id=411 bgcolor=#fefefe
| 463411 ||  || — || December 31, 2008 || Kitt Peak || Spacewatch || — || align=right data-sort-value="0.67" | 670 m || 
|-id=412 bgcolor=#fefefe
| 463412 ||  || — || September 24, 2007 || Kitt Peak || Spacewatch || — || align=right data-sort-value="0.63" | 630 m || 
|-id=413 bgcolor=#fefefe
| 463413 ||  || — || September 13, 2007 || Mount Lemmon || Mount Lemmon Survey || — || align=right data-sort-value="0.60" | 600 m || 
|-id=414 bgcolor=#fefefe
| 463414 ||  || — || November 19, 2008 || Kitt Peak || Spacewatch || — || align=right data-sort-value="0.56" | 560 m || 
|-id=415 bgcolor=#fefefe
| 463415 ||  || — || September 28, 2011 || Mount Lemmon || Mount Lemmon Survey || — || align=right data-sort-value="0.67" | 670 m || 
|-id=416 bgcolor=#fefefe
| 463416 ||  || — || September 15, 2007 || Mount Lemmon || Mount Lemmon Survey || — || align=right data-sort-value="0.54" | 540 m || 
|-id=417 bgcolor=#fefefe
| 463417 ||  || — || March 13, 2013 || Cerro Tololo-DECam || Spacewatch || — || align=right data-sort-value="0.54" | 540 m || 
|-id=418 bgcolor=#fefefe
| 463418 ||  || — || February 1, 2009 || Kitt Peak || Spacewatch || — || align=right data-sort-value="0.54" | 540 m || 
|-id=419 bgcolor=#fefefe
| 463419 ||  || — || October 21, 2011 || Mount Lemmon || Mount Lemmon Survey || — || align=right data-sort-value="0.54" | 540 m || 
|-id=420 bgcolor=#fefefe
| 463420 ||  || — || October 22, 2008 || Kitt Peak || Spacewatch || — || align=right data-sort-value="0.56" | 560 m || 
|-id=421 bgcolor=#fefefe
| 463421 ||  || — || March 27, 2003 || Campo Imperatore || CINEOS || — || align=right data-sort-value="0.54" | 540 m || 
|-id=422 bgcolor=#fefefe
| 463422 ||  || — || February 5, 2009 || Kitt Peak || Spacewatch || (883) || align=right data-sort-value="0.94" | 940 m || 
|-id=423 bgcolor=#fefefe
| 463423 ||  || — || November 7, 2007 || Catalina || CSS || — || align=right data-sort-value="0.91" | 910 m || 
|-id=424 bgcolor=#E9E9E9
| 463424 ||  || — || September 25, 2001 || Socorro || LINEAR || — || align=right | 1.8 km || 
|-id=425 bgcolor=#fefefe
| 463425 ||  || — || September 4, 2000 || Anderson Mesa || LONEOS || — || align=right | 1.9 km || 
|-id=426 bgcolor=#fefefe
| 463426 ||  || — || December 29, 2005 || Kitt Peak || Spacewatch || — || align=right data-sort-value="0.54" | 540 m || 
|-id=427 bgcolor=#fefefe
| 463427 ||  || — || February 3, 2009 || Kitt Peak || Spacewatch || — || align=right data-sort-value="0.58" | 580 m || 
|-id=428 bgcolor=#fefefe
| 463428 ||  || — || October 19, 2007 || Mount Lemmon || Mount Lemmon Survey || — || align=right data-sort-value="0.67" | 670 m || 
|-id=429 bgcolor=#E9E9E9
| 463429 ||  || — || November 22, 2006 || Mount Lemmon || Mount Lemmon Survey || — || align=right | 1.7 km || 
|-id=430 bgcolor=#fefefe
| 463430 ||  || — || October 15, 2007 || Mount Lemmon || Mount Lemmon Survey || — || align=right data-sort-value="0.84" | 840 m || 
|-id=431 bgcolor=#E9E9E9
| 463431 ||  || — || June 3, 2013 || Kitt Peak || Spacewatch || — || align=right | 1.8 km || 
|-id=432 bgcolor=#fefefe
| 463432 ||  || — || December 21, 2008 || Kitt Peak || Spacewatch || — || align=right data-sort-value="0.80" | 800 m || 
|-id=433 bgcolor=#E9E9E9
| 463433 ||  || — || January 27, 2012 || Mount Lemmon || Mount Lemmon Survey || — || align=right | 3.1 km || 
|-id=434 bgcolor=#fefefe
| 463434 ||  || — || February 20, 2006 || Kitt Peak || Spacewatch || — || align=right data-sort-value="0.62" | 620 m || 
|-id=435 bgcolor=#E9E9E9
| 463435 ||  || — || October 1, 2010 || Kitt Peak || Spacewatch || — || align=right | 1.2 km || 
|-id=436 bgcolor=#fefefe
| 463436 ||  || — || October 10, 2002 || Apache Point || SDSS || NYS || align=right data-sort-value="0.61" | 610 m || 
|-id=437 bgcolor=#fefefe
| 463437 ||  || — || May 27, 2009 || Mount Lemmon || Mount Lemmon Survey || — || align=right data-sort-value="0.81" | 810 m || 
|-id=438 bgcolor=#fefefe
| 463438 ||  || — || May 3, 2006 || Mount Lemmon || Mount Lemmon Survey || — || align=right data-sort-value="0.62" | 620 m || 
|-id=439 bgcolor=#fefefe
| 463439 ||  || — || August 25, 1998 || Caussols || ODAS || — || align=right data-sort-value="0.79" | 790 m || 
|-id=440 bgcolor=#fefefe
| 463440 ||  || — || March 8, 2005 || Kitt Peak || Spacewatch || — || align=right data-sort-value="0.85" | 850 m || 
|-id=441 bgcolor=#fefefe
| 463441 ||  || — || April 2, 2006 || Mount Lemmon || Mount Lemmon Survey || — || align=right data-sort-value="0.66" | 660 m || 
|-id=442 bgcolor=#E9E9E9
| 463442 ||  || — || March 29, 2008 || Catalina || CSS || — || align=right | 1.7 km || 
|-id=443 bgcolor=#E9E9E9
| 463443 ||  || — || August 17, 2009 || Kitt Peak || Spacewatch || ADE || align=right | 1.7 km || 
|-id=444 bgcolor=#fefefe
| 463444 ||  || — || March 8, 2005 || Mount Lemmon || Mount Lemmon Survey || NYS || align=right data-sort-value="0.65" | 650 m || 
|-id=445 bgcolor=#d6d6d6
| 463445 ||  || — || October 27, 2008 || Mount Lemmon || Mount Lemmon Survey || HYG || align=right | 2.9 km || 
|-id=446 bgcolor=#d6d6d6
| 463446 ||  || — || February 13, 2011 || Mount Lemmon || Mount Lemmon Survey || — || align=right | 2.7 km || 
|-id=447 bgcolor=#E9E9E9
| 463447 ||  || — || December 13, 2006 || Kitt Peak || Spacewatch || ADE || align=right | 2.1 km || 
|-id=448 bgcolor=#d6d6d6
| 463448 ||  || — || February 28, 2010 || WISE || WISE || — || align=right | 2.5 km || 
|-id=449 bgcolor=#fefefe
| 463449 ||  || — || September 18, 2003 || Kitt Peak || Spacewatch || — || align=right data-sort-value="0.61" | 610 m || 
|-id=450 bgcolor=#fefefe
| 463450 ||  || — || May 19, 2006 || Mount Lemmon || Mount Lemmon Survey || — || align=right data-sort-value="0.65" | 650 m || 
|-id=451 bgcolor=#fefefe
| 463451 ||  || — || March 29, 2009 || Kitt Peak || Spacewatch || — || align=right data-sort-value="0.62" | 620 m || 
|-id=452 bgcolor=#E9E9E9
| 463452 ||  || — || February 21, 2007 || Mount Lemmon || Mount Lemmon Survey || — || align=right | 1.8 km || 
|-id=453 bgcolor=#fefefe
| 463453 ||  || — || October 4, 2006 || Mount Lemmon || Mount Lemmon Survey || — || align=right data-sort-value="0.96" | 960 m || 
|-id=454 bgcolor=#fefefe
| 463454 ||  || — || December 18, 2007 || Mount Lemmon || Mount Lemmon Survey || — || align=right data-sort-value="0.95" | 950 m || 
|-id=455 bgcolor=#d6d6d6
| 463455 ||  || — || February 27, 2010 || WISE || WISE || — || align=right | 3.3 km || 
|-id=456 bgcolor=#fefefe
| 463456 ||  || — || October 19, 2006 || Mount Lemmon || Mount Lemmon Survey || — || align=right data-sort-value="0.83" | 830 m || 
|-id=457 bgcolor=#E9E9E9
| 463457 ||  || — || September 28, 2009 || Kitt Peak || Spacewatch || — || align=right | 2.4 km || 
|-id=458 bgcolor=#d6d6d6
| 463458 ||  || — || October 10, 2008 || Mount Lemmon || Mount Lemmon Survey || — || align=right | 2.6 km || 
|-id=459 bgcolor=#d6d6d6
| 463459 ||  || — || November 21, 2003 || Kitt Peak || Spacewatch || EOS || align=right | 1.7 km || 
|-id=460 bgcolor=#E9E9E9
| 463460 ||  || — || December 21, 2006 || Mount Lemmon || Mount Lemmon Survey || — || align=right | 1.5 km || 
|-id=461 bgcolor=#E9E9E9
| 463461 ||  || — || February 19, 2012 || Kitt Peak || Spacewatch || (5) || align=right data-sort-value="0.86" | 860 m || 
|-id=462 bgcolor=#d6d6d6
| 463462 ||  || — || October 31, 2008 || Catalina || CSS || — || align=right | 4.1 km || 
|-id=463 bgcolor=#E9E9E9
| 463463 ||  || — || June 7, 2013 || Mount Lemmon || Mount Lemmon Survey || — || align=right | 2.7 km || 
|-id=464 bgcolor=#fefefe
| 463464 ||  || — || March 3, 2005 || Kitt Peak || Spacewatch || — || align=right | 1.2 km || 
|-id=465 bgcolor=#E9E9E9
| 463465 ||  || — || December 25, 2005 || Kitt Peak || Spacewatch || — || align=right | 2.4 km || 
|-id=466 bgcolor=#d6d6d6
| 463466 ||  || — || April 15, 2007 || Kitt Peak || Spacewatch || — || align=right | 1.9 km || 
|-id=467 bgcolor=#fefefe
| 463467 ||  || — || February 10, 2008 || Kitt Peak || Spacewatch || NYS || align=right data-sort-value="0.74" | 740 m || 
|-id=468 bgcolor=#E9E9E9
| 463468 ||  || — || January 3, 2011 || Mount Lemmon || Mount Lemmon Survey || — || align=right | 1.2 km || 
|-id=469 bgcolor=#E9E9E9
| 463469 ||  || — || June 13, 2004 || Kitt Peak || Spacewatch || — || align=right | 1.4 km || 
|-id=470 bgcolor=#E9E9E9
| 463470 ||  || — || August 15, 2004 || Campo Imperatore || CINEOS || — || align=right | 2.1 km || 
|-id=471 bgcolor=#E9E9E9
| 463471 ||  || — || September 8, 1996 || Kitt Peak || Spacewatch || — || align=right | 1.2 km || 
|-id=472 bgcolor=#d6d6d6
| 463472 ||  || — || September 16, 2003 || Kitt Peak || Spacewatch || — || align=right | 1.9 km || 
|-id=473 bgcolor=#E9E9E9
| 463473 ||  || — || January 26, 2010 || WISE || WISE || — || align=right | 3.0 km || 
|-id=474 bgcolor=#E9E9E9
| 463474 ||  || — || August 31, 2005 || Anderson Mesa || LONEOS || — || align=right data-sort-value="0.96" | 960 m || 
|-id=475 bgcolor=#d6d6d6
| 463475 ||  || — || May 17, 2012 || Kitt Peak || Spacewatch || — || align=right | 4.2 km || 
|-id=476 bgcolor=#E9E9E9
| 463476 ||  || — || September 17, 2009 || Mount Lemmon || Mount Lemmon Survey || — || align=right | 1.4 km || 
|-id=477 bgcolor=#E9E9E9
| 463477 ||  || — || July 27, 2009 || Kitt Peak || Spacewatch || — || align=right | 1.0 km || 
|-id=478 bgcolor=#E9E9E9
| 463478 ||  || — || September 7, 2004 || Kitt Peak || Spacewatch || — || align=right | 1.9 km || 
|-id=479 bgcolor=#d6d6d6
| 463479 ||  || — || October 8, 2008 || Mount Lemmon || Mount Lemmon Survey || EOS || align=right | 1.6 km || 
|-id=480 bgcolor=#FA8072
| 463480 ||  || — || January 19, 2012 || Kitt Peak || Spacewatch || — || align=right data-sort-value="0.95" | 950 m || 
|-id=481 bgcolor=#E9E9E9
| 463481 ||  || — || April 22, 2012 || Kitt Peak || Spacewatch || — || align=right | 2.0 km || 
|-id=482 bgcolor=#d6d6d6
| 463482 ||  || — || May 3, 2010 || WISE || WISE || — || align=right | 3.5 km || 
|-id=483 bgcolor=#d6d6d6
| 463483 ||  || — || October 1, 2008 || Mount Lemmon || Mount Lemmon Survey || — || align=right | 2.8 km || 
|-id=484 bgcolor=#d6d6d6
| 463484 ||  || — || January 5, 2010 || Kitt Peak || Spacewatch || VER || align=right | 3.2 km || 
|-id=485 bgcolor=#E9E9E9
| 463485 ||  || — || September 19, 2009 || Kitt Peak || Spacewatch || — || align=right | 1.7 km || 
|-id=486 bgcolor=#fefefe
| 463486 ||  || — || April 5, 2005 || Mount Lemmon || Mount Lemmon Survey || MAS || align=right data-sort-value="0.86" | 860 m || 
|-id=487 bgcolor=#E9E9E9
| 463487 ||  || — || September 13, 2005 || Kitt Peak || Spacewatch || — || align=right data-sort-value="0.79" | 790 m || 
|-id=488 bgcolor=#fefefe
| 463488 ||  || — || February 12, 2008 || Kitt Peak || Spacewatch || NYS || align=right data-sort-value="0.56" | 560 m || 
|-id=489 bgcolor=#E9E9E9
| 463489 ||  || — || July 11, 2004 || Socorro || LINEAR || — || align=right | 2.6 km || 
|-id=490 bgcolor=#E9E9E9
| 463490 ||  || — || January 17, 2007 || Kitt Peak || Spacewatch || — || align=right | 1.7 km || 
|-id=491 bgcolor=#d6d6d6
| 463491 ||  || — || October 19, 2003 || Apache Point || SDSS || — || align=right | 2.0 km || 
|-id=492 bgcolor=#E9E9E9
| 463492 ||  || — || September 18, 2009 || Catalina || CSS || — || align=right | 1.7 km || 
|-id=493 bgcolor=#E9E9E9
| 463493 ||  || — || September 22, 2009 || Kitt Peak || Spacewatch || — || align=right | 1.8 km || 
|-id=494 bgcolor=#d6d6d6
| 463494 ||  || — || January 8, 2010 || Kitt Peak || Spacewatch || THM || align=right | 2.3 km || 
|-id=495 bgcolor=#E9E9E9
| 463495 ||  || — || March 10, 2008 || Kitt Peak || Spacewatch || — || align=right data-sort-value="0.77" | 770 m || 
|-id=496 bgcolor=#d6d6d6
| 463496 ||  || — || February 16, 2010 || Mount Lemmon || Mount Lemmon Survey || — || align=right | 2.7 km || 
|-id=497 bgcolor=#E9E9E9
| 463497 ||  || — || March 25, 2012 || Mount Lemmon || Mount Lemmon Survey || — || align=right | 1.9 km || 
|-id=498 bgcolor=#d6d6d6
| 463498 ||  || — || April 6, 2010 || WISE || WISE || — || align=right | 4.7 km || 
|-id=499 bgcolor=#fefefe
| 463499 ||  || — || April 20, 2009 || Mount Lemmon || Mount Lemmon Survey || NYS || align=right data-sort-value="0.64" | 640 m || 
|-id=500 bgcolor=#E9E9E9
| 463500 ||  || — || November 9, 2009 || Mount Lemmon || Mount Lemmon Survey || — || align=right | 1.9 km || 
|}

463501–463600 

|-bgcolor=#fefefe
| 463501 ||  || — || May 9, 2005 || Kitt Peak || Spacewatch || V || align=right data-sort-value="0.69" | 690 m || 
|-id=502 bgcolor=#fefefe
| 463502 ||  || — || February 7, 2008 || Kitt Peak || Spacewatch || — || align=right data-sort-value="0.81" | 810 m || 
|-id=503 bgcolor=#E9E9E9
| 463503 ||  || — || September 15, 2009 || Kitt Peak || Spacewatch || — || align=right | 1.3 km || 
|-id=504 bgcolor=#fefefe
| 463504 ||  || — || July 30, 2013 || Kitt Peak || Spacewatch || — || align=right data-sort-value="0.79" | 790 m || 
|-id=505 bgcolor=#d6d6d6
| 463505 ||  || — || September 19, 2008 || Kitt Peak || Spacewatch || EOS || align=right | 1.6 km || 
|-id=506 bgcolor=#d6d6d6
| 463506 ||  || — || April 22, 2012 || Kitt Peak || Spacewatch || EOS || align=right | 1.9 km || 
|-id=507 bgcolor=#fefefe
| 463507 ||  || — || February 13, 2008 || Mount Lemmon || Mount Lemmon Survey || — || align=right data-sort-value="0.70" | 700 m || 
|-id=508 bgcolor=#d6d6d6
| 463508 ||  || — || March 4, 2011 || Catalina || CSS || EOS || align=right | 1.9 km || 
|-id=509 bgcolor=#E9E9E9
| 463509 ||  || — || September 23, 2009 || Mount Lemmon || Mount Lemmon Survey || — || align=right | 1.3 km || 
|-id=510 bgcolor=#fefefe
| 463510 ||  || — || September 29, 2003 || Kitt Peak || Spacewatch || — || align=right data-sort-value="0.77" | 770 m || 
|-id=511 bgcolor=#fefefe
| 463511 ||  || — || March 1, 2008 || Kitt Peak || Spacewatch || — || align=right | 1.1 km || 
|-id=512 bgcolor=#fefefe
| 463512 ||  || — || February 21, 2012 || Kitt Peak || Spacewatch || — || align=right data-sort-value="0.91" | 910 m || 
|-id=513 bgcolor=#d6d6d6
| 463513 ||  || — || September 7, 2008 || Mount Lemmon || Mount Lemmon Survey || EOS || align=right | 1.3 km || 
|-id=514 bgcolor=#E9E9E9
| 463514 ||  || — || February 23, 2007 || Mount Lemmon || Mount Lemmon Survey || — || align=right | 2.0 km || 
|-id=515 bgcolor=#E9E9E9
| 463515 ||  || — || July 30, 2013 || Kitt Peak || Spacewatch || MAR || align=right data-sort-value="0.83" | 830 m || 
|-id=516 bgcolor=#d6d6d6
| 463516 ||  || — || February 26, 2011 || Mount Lemmon || Mount Lemmon Survey || — || align=right | 2.3 km || 
|-id=517 bgcolor=#E9E9E9
| 463517 ||  || — || October 28, 2005 || Kitt Peak || Spacewatch || — || align=right | 1.1 km || 
|-id=518 bgcolor=#fefefe
| 463518 ||  || — || September 29, 2003 || Kitt Peak || Spacewatch || — || align=right data-sort-value="0.68" | 680 m || 
|-id=519 bgcolor=#E9E9E9
| 463519 ||  || — || November 17, 2009 || Mount Lemmon || Mount Lemmon Survey || AGN || align=right data-sort-value="0.92" | 920 m || 
|-id=520 bgcolor=#E9E9E9
| 463520 ||  || — || January 5, 2006 || Kitt Peak || Spacewatch || NEM || align=right | 2.2 km || 
|-id=521 bgcolor=#d6d6d6
| 463521 ||  || — || September 28, 2003 || Apache Point || SDSS || — || align=right | 2.4 km || 
|-id=522 bgcolor=#d6d6d6
| 463522 ||  || — || October 6, 2008 || Mount Lemmon || Mount Lemmon Survey || — || align=right | 2.3 km || 
|-id=523 bgcolor=#d6d6d6
| 463523 ||  || — || October 9, 2008 || Mount Lemmon || Mount Lemmon Survey || VER || align=right | 2.5 km || 
|-id=524 bgcolor=#E9E9E9
| 463524 ||  || — || July 11, 2004 || Palomar || NEAT || — || align=right | 2.3 km || 
|-id=525 bgcolor=#E9E9E9
| 463525 ||  || — || January 31, 2003 || Palomar || NEAT || — || align=right | 1.4 km || 
|-id=526 bgcolor=#E9E9E9
| 463526 ||  || — || March 28, 2012 || Mount Lemmon || Mount Lemmon Survey || — || align=right | 1.4 km || 
|-id=527 bgcolor=#E9E9E9
| 463527 ||  || — || November 15, 1995 || Kitt Peak || Spacewatch || — || align=right | 2.3 km || 
|-id=528 bgcolor=#E9E9E9
| 463528 ||  || — || September 11, 2004 || Kitt Peak || Spacewatch || WIT || align=right data-sort-value="0.90" | 900 m || 
|-id=529 bgcolor=#fefefe
| 463529 ||  || — || October 17, 2010 || Mount Lemmon || Mount Lemmon Survey || — || align=right data-sort-value="0.95" | 950 m || 
|-id=530 bgcolor=#E9E9E9
| 463530 ||  || — || January 12, 2011 || Mount Lemmon || Mount Lemmon Survey || — || align=right | 1.8 km || 
|-id=531 bgcolor=#E9E9E9
| 463531 ||  || — || July 28, 2013 || Kitt Peak || Spacewatch || — || align=right | 1.1 km || 
|-id=532 bgcolor=#d6d6d6
| 463532 ||  || — || September 12, 2007 || Mount Lemmon || Mount Lemmon Survey || — || align=right | 2.9 km || 
|-id=533 bgcolor=#E9E9E9
| 463533 ||  || — || May 29, 2008 || Mount Lemmon || Mount Lemmon Survey || — || align=right | 1.3 km || 
|-id=534 bgcolor=#E9E9E9
| 463534 ||  || — || March 13, 2007 || Mount Lemmon || Mount Lemmon Survey || — || align=right | 1.8 km || 
|-id=535 bgcolor=#d6d6d6
| 463535 ||  || — || March 6, 2011 || Mount Lemmon || Mount Lemmon Survey || — || align=right | 2.5 km || 
|-id=536 bgcolor=#E9E9E9
| 463536 ||  || — || November 23, 2009 || Mount Lemmon || Mount Lemmon Survey || — || align=right | 1.3 km || 
|-id=537 bgcolor=#fefefe
| 463537 ||  || — || January 25, 2011 || Mount Lemmon || Mount Lemmon Survey || — || align=right data-sort-value="0.92" | 920 m || 
|-id=538 bgcolor=#E9E9E9
| 463538 ||  || — || August 9, 2004 || Socorro || LINEAR || — || align=right | 1.8 km || 
|-id=539 bgcolor=#E9E9E9
| 463539 ||  || — || September 20, 2009 || Mount Lemmon || Mount Lemmon Survey || — || align=right | 1.3 km || 
|-id=540 bgcolor=#E9E9E9
| 463540 ||  || — || March 12, 2003 || Kitt Peak || Spacewatch || — || align=right | 1.6 km || 
|-id=541 bgcolor=#d6d6d6
| 463541 ||  || — || April 26, 2010 || WISE || WISE || — || align=right | 4.6 km || 
|-id=542 bgcolor=#d6d6d6
| 463542 ||  || — || June 21, 2007 || Mount Lemmon || Mount Lemmon Survey || — || align=right | 3.5 km || 
|-id=543 bgcolor=#d6d6d6
| 463543 ||  || — || October 29, 2008 || Kitt Peak || Spacewatch || — || align=right | 4.0 km || 
|-id=544 bgcolor=#d6d6d6
| 463544 ||  || — || August 30, 2008 || Socorro || LINEAR || — || align=right | 2.9 km || 
|-id=545 bgcolor=#E9E9E9
| 463545 ||  || — || September 11, 2004 || Socorro || LINEAR || — || align=right | 2.7 km || 
|-id=546 bgcolor=#d6d6d6
| 463546 ||  || — || September 6, 2008 || Mount Lemmon || Mount Lemmon Survey || KOR || align=right | 1.2 km || 
|-id=547 bgcolor=#d6d6d6
| 463547 ||  || — || September 3, 2008 || Kitt Peak || Spacewatch || — || align=right | 2.1 km || 
|-id=548 bgcolor=#E9E9E9
| 463548 ||  || — || October 4, 2004 || Kitt Peak || Spacewatch || — || align=right | 2.1 km || 
|-id=549 bgcolor=#fefefe
| 463549 ||  || — || July 30, 2009 || Catalina || CSS || — || align=right data-sort-value="0.90" | 900 m || 
|-id=550 bgcolor=#E9E9E9
| 463550 ||  || — || April 7, 2003 || Kitt Peak || Spacewatch || — || align=right | 1.8 km || 
|-id=551 bgcolor=#fefefe
| 463551 ||  || — || October 31, 2006 || Mount Lemmon || Mount Lemmon Survey || — || align=right data-sort-value="0.92" | 920 m || 
|-id=552 bgcolor=#E9E9E9
| 463552 ||  || — || September 18, 2009 || Kitt Peak || Spacewatch || MAR || align=right data-sort-value="0.83" | 830 m || 
|-id=553 bgcolor=#E9E9E9
| 463553 ||  || — || April 8, 2003 || Kitt Peak || Spacewatch || — || align=right | 1.6 km || 
|-id=554 bgcolor=#d6d6d6
| 463554 ||  || — || September 29, 2008 || Mount Lemmon || Mount Lemmon Survey || EOS || align=right | 1.7 km || 
|-id=555 bgcolor=#fefefe
| 463555 ||  || — || November 1, 2006 || Mount Lemmon || Mount Lemmon Survey || — || align=right data-sort-value="0.89" | 890 m || 
|-id=556 bgcolor=#E9E9E9
| 463556 ||  || — || December 21, 2005 || Kitt Peak || Spacewatch || — || align=right | 2.2 km || 
|-id=557 bgcolor=#E9E9E9
| 463557 ||  || — || August 23, 2004 || Kitt Peak || Spacewatch || — || align=right | 1.8 km || 
|-id=558 bgcolor=#d6d6d6
| 463558 ||  || — || March 2, 2005 || Kitt Peak || Spacewatch || EOS || align=right | 1.8 km || 
|-id=559 bgcolor=#d6d6d6
| 463559 ||  || — || September 10, 2013 || Haleakala || Pan-STARRS || — || align=right | 4.2 km || 
|-id=560 bgcolor=#E9E9E9
| 463560 ||  || — || January 16, 2011 || Mount Lemmon || Mount Lemmon Survey || — || align=right | 2.5 km || 
|-id=561 bgcolor=#d6d6d6
| 463561 ||  || — || March 10, 2011 || Kitt Peak || Spacewatch || EOS || align=right | 1.6 km || 
|-id=562 bgcolor=#E9E9E9
| 463562 ||  || — || October 7, 2004 || Kitt Peak || Spacewatch || — || align=right | 2.1 km || 
|-id=563 bgcolor=#d6d6d6
| 463563 ||  || — || September 25, 2008 || Mount Lemmon || Mount Lemmon Survey || — || align=right | 2.2 km || 
|-id=564 bgcolor=#fefefe
| 463564 ||  || — || February 23, 2012 || Mount Lemmon || Mount Lemmon Survey || NYS || align=right data-sort-value="0.68" | 680 m || 
|-id=565 bgcolor=#d6d6d6
| 463565 ||  || — || March 30, 2011 || Mount Lemmon || Mount Lemmon Survey || — || align=right | 2.6 km || 
|-id=566 bgcolor=#d6d6d6
| 463566 ||  || — || March 4, 2005 || Mount Lemmon || Mount Lemmon Survey || — || align=right | 3.6 km || 
|-id=567 bgcolor=#E9E9E9
| 463567 ||  || — || March 6, 2011 || Mount Lemmon || Mount Lemmon Survey || — || align=right | 2.2 km || 
|-id=568 bgcolor=#E9E9E9
| 463568 ||  || — || September 15, 2009 || Kitt Peak || Spacewatch || — || align=right | 1.0 km || 
|-id=569 bgcolor=#fefefe
| 463569 ||  || — || March 15, 2012 || Kitt Peak || Spacewatch || — || align=right | 1.0 km || 
|-id=570 bgcolor=#d6d6d6
| 463570 ||  || — || October 24, 2008 || Kitt Peak || Spacewatch || — || align=right | 2.6 km || 
|-id=571 bgcolor=#d6d6d6
| 463571 ||  || — || February 8, 2011 || Mount Lemmon || Mount Lemmon Survey || Tj (2.92) || align=right | 3.5 km || 
|-id=572 bgcolor=#d6d6d6
| 463572 ||  || — || September 23, 2008 || Kitt Peak || Spacewatch || — || align=right | 2.4 km || 
|-id=573 bgcolor=#d6d6d6
| 463573 ||  || — || February 9, 2005 || Kitt Peak || Spacewatch || — || align=right | 3.4 km || 
|-id=574 bgcolor=#d6d6d6
| 463574 ||  || — || April 5, 2005 || Mount Lemmon || Mount Lemmon Survey || — || align=right | 2.8 km || 
|-id=575 bgcolor=#d6d6d6
| 463575 ||  || — || September 9, 2007 || Kitt Peak || Spacewatch || — || align=right | 3.5 km || 
|-id=576 bgcolor=#d6d6d6
| 463576 ||  || — || October 28, 2008 || Kitt Peak || Spacewatch || — || align=right | 2.4 km || 
|-id=577 bgcolor=#d6d6d6
| 463577 ||  || — || September 3, 2013 || Mount Lemmon || Mount Lemmon Survey || — || align=right | 2.7 km || 
|-id=578 bgcolor=#fefefe
| 463578 ||  || — || March 13, 2012 || Mount Lemmon || Mount Lemmon Survey || — || align=right data-sort-value="0.90" | 900 m || 
|-id=579 bgcolor=#d6d6d6
| 463579 ||  || — || September 24, 2008 || Kitt Peak || Spacewatch || — || align=right | 2.5 km || 
|-id=580 bgcolor=#E9E9E9
| 463580 ||  || — || October 15, 2004 || Mount Lemmon || Mount Lemmon Survey || — || align=right | 2.1 km || 
|-id=581 bgcolor=#E9E9E9
| 463581 ||  || — || March 13, 2007 || Kitt Peak || Spacewatch || — || align=right | 1.8 km || 
|-id=582 bgcolor=#d6d6d6
| 463582 ||  || — || May 19, 2010 || WISE || WISE || Tj (2.99) || align=right | 3.4 km || 
|-id=583 bgcolor=#E9E9E9
| 463583 ||  || — || September 16, 2009 || Kitt Peak || Spacewatch || ADE || align=right | 1.7 km || 
|-id=584 bgcolor=#E9E9E9
| 463584 ||  || — || March 26, 2007 || Kitt Peak || Spacewatch || GEF || align=right | 1.3 km || 
|-id=585 bgcolor=#E9E9E9
| 463585 ||  || — || April 6, 2008 || Kitt Peak || Spacewatch || JUN || align=right data-sort-value="0.96" | 960 m || 
|-id=586 bgcolor=#d6d6d6
| 463586 ||  || — || May 7, 2010 || WISE || WISE || — || align=right | 3.4 km || 
|-id=587 bgcolor=#d6d6d6
| 463587 ||  || — || October 21, 2008 || Mount Lemmon || Mount Lemmon Survey || — || align=right | 2.7 km || 
|-id=588 bgcolor=#d6d6d6
| 463588 ||  || — || December 16, 2009 || Mount Lemmon || Mount Lemmon Survey || — || align=right | 3.7 km || 
|-id=589 bgcolor=#d6d6d6
| 463589 ||  || — || September 25, 2008 || Kitt Peak || Spacewatch || EOS || align=right | 1.5 km || 
|-id=590 bgcolor=#d6d6d6
| 463590 ||  || — || March 17, 2005 || Mount Lemmon || Mount Lemmon Survey || — || align=right | 2.8 km || 
|-id=591 bgcolor=#d6d6d6
| 463591 ||  || — || October 2, 2008 || Kitt Peak || Spacewatch || — || align=right | 2.4 km || 
|-id=592 bgcolor=#d6d6d6
| 463592 ||  || — || September 1, 2013 || Mount Lemmon || Mount Lemmon Survey || — || align=right | 3.5 km || 
|-id=593 bgcolor=#d6d6d6
| 463593 ||  || — || September 7, 2008 || Mount Lemmon || Mount Lemmon Survey || — || align=right | 3.1 km || 
|-id=594 bgcolor=#d6d6d6
| 463594 ||  || — || January 15, 2005 || Kitt Peak || Spacewatch || — || align=right | 2.3 km || 
|-id=595 bgcolor=#E9E9E9
| 463595 ||  || — || September 13, 2013 || Mount Lemmon || Mount Lemmon Survey || — || align=right | 1.9 km || 
|-id=596 bgcolor=#E9E9E9
| 463596 ||  || — || September 26, 2009 || Catalina || CSS || — || align=right | 1.3 km || 
|-id=597 bgcolor=#E9E9E9
| 463597 ||  || — || November 19, 2001 || Socorro || LINEAR || — || align=right | 1.3 km || 
|-id=598 bgcolor=#d6d6d6
| 463598 ||  || — || September 23, 2008 || Kitt Peak || Spacewatch || — || align=right | 2.7 km || 
|-id=599 bgcolor=#fefefe
| 463599 ||  || — || June 12, 2005 || Kitt Peak || Spacewatch || — || align=right data-sort-value="0.78" | 780 m || 
|-id=600 bgcolor=#d6d6d6
| 463600 ||  || — || October 1, 2002 || Haleakala || NEAT || — || align=right | 3.2 km || 
|}

463601–463700 

|-bgcolor=#d6d6d6
| 463601 ||  || — || September 3, 2007 || Catalina || CSS || — || align=right | 3.2 km || 
|-id=602 bgcolor=#d6d6d6
| 463602 ||  || — || November 20, 2008 || Kitt Peak || Spacewatch || — || align=right | 3.0 km || 
|-id=603 bgcolor=#d6d6d6
| 463603 ||  || — || October 21, 2008 || Mount Lemmon || Mount Lemmon Survey || — || align=right | 3.0 km || 
|-id=604 bgcolor=#d6d6d6
| 463604 ||  || — || October 3, 2002 || Palomar || NEAT || — || align=right | 3.2 km || 
|-id=605 bgcolor=#d6d6d6
| 463605 ||  || — || October 6, 1996 || Kitt Peak || Spacewatch || HYG || align=right | 2.6 km || 
|-id=606 bgcolor=#E9E9E9
| 463606 ||  || — || January 21, 2010 || WISE || WISE || — || align=right | 3.0 km || 
|-id=607 bgcolor=#E9E9E9
| 463607 ||  || — || April 24, 2003 || Kitt Peak || Spacewatch || — || align=right | 2.2 km || 
|-id=608 bgcolor=#E9E9E9
| 463608 ||  || — || October 7, 2005 || Kitt Peak || Spacewatch || — || align=right data-sort-value="0.79" | 790 m || 
|-id=609 bgcolor=#d6d6d6
| 463609 ||  || — || January 31, 2006 || Kitt Peak || Spacewatch || KOR || align=right | 1.3 km || 
|-id=610 bgcolor=#d6d6d6
| 463610 ||  || — || September 12, 2013 || Catalina || CSS || — || align=right | 2.9 km || 
|-id=611 bgcolor=#E9E9E9
| 463611 ||  || — || October 11, 2004 || Palomar || NEAT || — || align=right | 2.9 km || 
|-id=612 bgcolor=#E9E9E9
| 463612 ||  || — || September 25, 1995 || Kitt Peak || Spacewatch || — || align=right | 1.9 km || 
|-id=613 bgcolor=#E9E9E9
| 463613 ||  || — || April 11, 2003 || Kitt Peak || Spacewatch || — || align=right | 2.3 km || 
|-id=614 bgcolor=#d6d6d6
| 463614 ||  || — || September 3, 2013 || Kitt Peak || Spacewatch || — || align=right | 2.5 km || 
|-id=615 bgcolor=#fefefe
| 463615 ||  || — || May 11, 2005 || Palomar || NEAT || — || align=right data-sort-value="0.87" | 870 m || 
|-id=616 bgcolor=#E9E9E9
| 463616 ||  || — || September 17, 2009 || Kitt Peak || Spacewatch || EUN || align=right | 1.0 km || 
|-id=617 bgcolor=#E9E9E9
| 463617 ||  || — || October 26, 2009 || Mount Lemmon || Mount Lemmon Survey || MAR || align=right | 1.1 km || 
|-id=618 bgcolor=#d6d6d6
| 463618 ||  || — || September 4, 2013 || Mount Lemmon || Mount Lemmon Survey || — || align=right | 2.9 km || 
|-id=619 bgcolor=#d6d6d6
| 463619 ||  || — || September 26, 2008 || Kitt Peak || Spacewatch || — || align=right | 2.9 km || 
|-id=620 bgcolor=#d6d6d6
| 463620 ||  || — || March 16, 2005 || Kitt Peak || Spacewatch || — || align=right | 3.1 km || 
|-id=621 bgcolor=#d6d6d6
| 463621 ||  || — || September 12, 2007 || Mount Lemmon || Mount Lemmon Survey || — || align=right | 2.9 km || 
|-id=622 bgcolor=#d6d6d6
| 463622 ||  || — || November 13, 2002 || Palomar || NEAT || — || align=right | 3.9 km || 
|-id=623 bgcolor=#E9E9E9
| 463623 ||  || — || March 15, 2007 || Kitt Peak || Spacewatch || — || align=right | 2.0 km || 
|-id=624 bgcolor=#E9E9E9
| 463624 ||  || — || March 23, 2003 || Kitt Peak || Spacewatch || — || align=right | 1.3 km || 
|-id=625 bgcolor=#E9E9E9
| 463625 ||  || — || April 22, 2007 || Mount Lemmon || Mount Lemmon Survey || GEF || align=right | 1.4 km || 
|-id=626 bgcolor=#E9E9E9
| 463626 ||  || — || March 14, 2007 || Mount Lemmon || Mount Lemmon Survey || — || align=right | 3.3 km || 
|-id=627 bgcolor=#fefefe
| 463627 ||  || — || November 30, 2003 || Kitt Peak || Spacewatch || — || align=right data-sort-value="0.79" | 790 m || 
|-id=628 bgcolor=#fefefe
| 463628 ||  || — || September 20, 2006 || Anderson Mesa || LONEOS || — || align=right data-sort-value="0.88" | 880 m || 
|-id=629 bgcolor=#E9E9E9
| 463629 ||  || — || March 16, 2007 || Kitt Peak || Spacewatch || — || align=right | 2.4 km || 
|-id=630 bgcolor=#d6d6d6
| 463630 ||  || — || May 27, 2010 || WISE || WISE || — || align=right | 3.5 km || 
|-id=631 bgcolor=#d6d6d6
| 463631 ||  || — || October 26, 2008 || Kitt Peak || Spacewatch || — || align=right | 2.9 km || 
|-id=632 bgcolor=#E9E9E9
| 463632 ||  || — || May 28, 2008 || Desert Eagle || W. K. Y. Yeung || — || align=right | 1.3 km || 
|-id=633 bgcolor=#d6d6d6
| 463633 ||  || — || March 8, 2005 || Mount Lemmon || Mount Lemmon Survey || — || align=right | 2.7 km || 
|-id=634 bgcolor=#d6d6d6
| 463634 ||  || — || October 28, 2008 || Kitt Peak || Spacewatch || EOS || align=right | 2.1 km || 
|-id=635 bgcolor=#d6d6d6
| 463635 ||  || — || October 20, 2008 || Kitt Peak || Spacewatch || — || align=right | 2.8 km || 
|-id=636 bgcolor=#d6d6d6
| 463636 ||  || — || October 23, 2008 || Kitt Peak || Spacewatch || — || align=right | 2.3 km || 
|-id=637 bgcolor=#d6d6d6
| 463637 ||  || — || April 16, 2005 || Kitt Peak || Spacewatch || — || align=right | 3.2 km || 
|-id=638 bgcolor=#E9E9E9
| 463638 ||  || — || January 28, 2011 || Mount Lemmon || Mount Lemmon Survey || — || align=right | 1.7 km || 
|-id=639 bgcolor=#E9E9E9
| 463639 ||  || — || September 30, 1991 || Kitt Peak || Spacewatch || — || align=right | 1.8 km || 
|-id=640 bgcolor=#E9E9E9
| 463640 ||  || — || May 29, 2008 || Mount Lemmon || Mount Lemmon Survey || — || align=right | 1.1 km || 
|-id=641 bgcolor=#d6d6d6
| 463641 ||  || — || September 28, 2013 || Mount Lemmon || Mount Lemmon Survey || EOS || align=right | 1.9 km || 
|-id=642 bgcolor=#d6d6d6
| 463642 ||  || — || June 1, 2010 || WISE || WISE || — || align=right | 3.5 km || 
|-id=643 bgcolor=#E9E9E9
| 463643 ||  || — || April 30, 2012 || Mount Lemmon || Mount Lemmon Survey || — || align=right | 1.3 km || 
|-id=644 bgcolor=#E9E9E9
| 463644 ||  || — || September 21, 2009 || Mount Lemmon || Mount Lemmon Survey || — || align=right | 2.4 km || 
|-id=645 bgcolor=#d6d6d6
| 463645 ||  || — || December 1, 2008 || Mount Lemmon || Mount Lemmon Survey || VER || align=right | 3.2 km || 
|-id=646 bgcolor=#E9E9E9
| 463646 ||  || — || April 29, 2012 || Mount Lemmon || Mount Lemmon Survey || — || align=right | 1.8 km || 
|-id=647 bgcolor=#E9E9E9
| 463647 ||  || — || November 9, 2009 || Mount Lemmon || Mount Lemmon Survey || — || align=right | 2.3 km || 
|-id=648 bgcolor=#d6d6d6
| 463648 ||  || — || March 10, 2011 || Kitt Peak || Spacewatch || KOR || align=right | 1.4 km || 
|-id=649 bgcolor=#d6d6d6
| 463649 ||  || — || October 27, 2008 || Mount Lemmon || Mount Lemmon Survey || — || align=right | 3.6 km || 
|-id=650 bgcolor=#d6d6d6
| 463650 ||  || — || October 10, 2002 || Apache Point || SDSS || — || align=right | 4.7 km || 
|-id=651 bgcolor=#d6d6d6
| 463651 ||  || — || March 20, 2010 || Mount Lemmon || Mount Lemmon Survey || — || align=right | 4.1 km || 
|-id=652 bgcolor=#E9E9E9
| 463652 ||  || — || August 28, 2013 || Mount Lemmon || Mount Lemmon Survey || — || align=right | 2.1 km || 
|-id=653 bgcolor=#fefefe
| 463653 ||  || — || August 27, 2006 || Anderson Mesa || LONEOS || — || align=right data-sort-value="0.72" | 720 m || 
|-id=654 bgcolor=#d6d6d6
| 463654 ||  || — || September 13, 2013 || Mount Lemmon || Mount Lemmon Survey || — || align=right | 3.4 km || 
|-id=655 bgcolor=#fefefe
| 463655 ||  || — || August 24, 1998 || Socorro || LINEAR || — || align=right | 1.0 km || 
|-id=656 bgcolor=#E9E9E9
| 463656 ||  || — || July 28, 2008 || Mount Lemmon || Mount Lemmon Survey || — || align=right | 3.3 km || 
|-id=657 bgcolor=#d6d6d6
| 463657 ||  || — || August 28, 2002 || Palomar || NEAT || EOS || align=right | 1.7 km || 
|-id=658 bgcolor=#d6d6d6
| 463658 ||  || — || October 29, 2003 || Kitt Peak || Spacewatch || — || align=right | 2.9 km || 
|-id=659 bgcolor=#d6d6d6
| 463659 ||  || — || July 21, 2012 || Siding Spring || SSS || — || align=right | 2.9 km || 
|-id=660 bgcolor=#d6d6d6
| 463660 ||  || — || December 4, 2008 || Kitt Peak || Spacewatch || — || align=right | 3.2 km || 
|-id=661 bgcolor=#d6d6d6
| 463661 ||  || — || October 7, 2008 || Mount Lemmon || Mount Lemmon Survey || — || align=right | 3.3 km || 
|-id=662 bgcolor=#d6d6d6
| 463662 ||  || — || May 18, 2010 || WISE || WISE || — || align=right | 3.6 km || 
|-id=663 bgcolor=#C7FF8F
| 463663 ||  || — || December 13, 2013 || Mount Lemmon || Mount Lemmon Survey || centaur || align=right | 24 km || 
|-id=664 bgcolor=#FFC2E0
| 463664 ||  || — || May 4, 2014 || Mount Lemmon || Mount Lemmon Survey || APO || align=right data-sort-value="0.87" | 870 m || 
|-id=665 bgcolor=#fefefe
| 463665 ||  || — || October 15, 2004 || Mount Lemmon || Mount Lemmon Survey || — || align=right data-sort-value="0.67" | 670 m || 
|-id=666 bgcolor=#FA8072
| 463666 ||  || — || February 24, 2009 || Kitt Peak || Spacewatch || — || align=right data-sort-value="0.55" | 550 m || 
|-id=667 bgcolor=#fefefe
| 463667 ||  || — || September 28, 1997 || Kitt Peak || Spacewatch || H || align=right data-sort-value="0.40" | 400 m || 
|-id=668 bgcolor=#E9E9E9
| 463668 ||  || — || July 25, 2006 || Mount Lemmon || Mount Lemmon Survey || — || align=right | 1.2 km || 
|-id=669 bgcolor=#fefefe
| 463669 ||  || — || February 3, 2008 || Kitt Peak || Spacewatch || H || align=right data-sort-value="0.56" | 560 m || 
|-id=670 bgcolor=#fefefe
| 463670 ||  || — || August 26, 2009 || Catalina || CSS || H || align=right data-sort-value="0.66" | 660 m || 
|-id=671 bgcolor=#FA8072
| 463671 ||  || — || October 27, 2011 || Catalina || CSS || — || align=right data-sort-value="0.62" | 620 m || 
|-id=672 bgcolor=#fefefe
| 463672 ||  || — || September 4, 2008 || Kitt Peak || Spacewatch || — || align=right data-sort-value="0.60" | 600 m || 
|-id=673 bgcolor=#fefefe
| 463673 ||  || — || August 31, 2000 || Kitt Peak || Spacewatch || — || align=right data-sort-value="0.50" | 500 m || 
|-id=674 bgcolor=#fefefe
| 463674 ||  || — || August 22, 2004 || Kitt Peak || Spacewatch || — || align=right data-sort-value="0.73" | 730 m || 
|-id=675 bgcolor=#E9E9E9
| 463675 ||  || — || September 17, 2010 || Catalina || CSS || — || align=right | 1.5 km || 
|-id=676 bgcolor=#fefefe
| 463676 ||  || — || September 10, 2007 || Catalina || CSS || — || align=right data-sort-value="0.69" | 690 m || 
|-id=677 bgcolor=#fefefe
| 463677 ||  || — || December 29, 2008 || Mount Lemmon || Mount Lemmon Survey || V || align=right data-sort-value="0.51" | 510 m || 
|-id=678 bgcolor=#E9E9E9
| 463678 ||  || — || October 7, 2010 || Catalina || CSS || — || align=right data-sort-value="0.90" | 900 m || 
|-id=679 bgcolor=#fefefe
| 463679 ||  || — || October 9, 2005 || Kitt Peak || Spacewatch || — || align=right data-sort-value="0.57" | 570 m || 
|-id=680 bgcolor=#fefefe
| 463680 ||  || — || October 24, 1995 || Kitt Peak || Spacewatch || — || align=right data-sort-value="0.71" | 710 m || 
|-id=681 bgcolor=#fefefe
| 463681 ||  || — || November 15, 2007 || Mount Lemmon || Mount Lemmon Survey || — || align=right data-sort-value="0.91" | 910 m || 
|-id=682 bgcolor=#E9E9E9
| 463682 ||  || — || July 29, 2005 || Palomar || NEAT || — || align=right | 1.8 km || 
|-id=683 bgcolor=#E9E9E9
| 463683 ||  || — || October 4, 2006 || Mount Lemmon || Mount Lemmon Survey || (5) || align=right data-sort-value="0.81" | 810 m || 
|-id=684 bgcolor=#fefefe
| 463684 ||  || — || September 7, 1999 || Kitt Peak || Spacewatch || NYS || align=right data-sort-value="0.68" | 680 m || 
|-id=685 bgcolor=#E9E9E9
| 463685 ||  || — || September 18, 2001 || Kitt Peak || Spacewatch || — || align=right | 1.4 km || 
|-id=686 bgcolor=#E9E9E9
| 463686 ||  || — || October 28, 2005 || Mount Lemmon || Mount Lemmon Survey || — || align=right | 1.9 km || 
|-id=687 bgcolor=#fefefe
| 463687 ||  || — || January 15, 2008 || Kitt Peak || Spacewatch || NYS || align=right data-sort-value="0.58" | 580 m || 
|-id=688 bgcolor=#fefefe
| 463688 ||  || — || July 4, 2010 || Mount Lemmon || Mount Lemmon Survey || — || align=right data-sort-value="0.98" | 980 m || 
|-id=689 bgcolor=#E9E9E9
| 463689 ||  || — || November 17, 2006 || Mount Lemmon || Mount Lemmon Survey || — || align=right | 2.3 km || 
|-id=690 bgcolor=#fefefe
| 463690 ||  || — || August 19, 2006 || Kitt Peak || Spacewatch || — || align=right data-sort-value="0.80" | 800 m || 
|-id=691 bgcolor=#fefefe
| 463691 ||  || — || February 1, 2012 || Mount Lemmon || Mount Lemmon Survey || V || align=right data-sort-value="0.57" | 570 m || 
|-id=692 bgcolor=#fefefe
| 463692 ||  || — || September 9, 2007 || Mount Lemmon || Mount Lemmon Survey || — || align=right data-sort-value="0.71" | 710 m || 
|-id=693 bgcolor=#E9E9E9
| 463693 ||  || — || November 25, 2006 || Mount Lemmon || Mount Lemmon Survey || — || align=right data-sort-value="0.94" | 940 m || 
|-id=694 bgcolor=#fefefe
| 463694 ||  || — || October 22, 2003 || Kitt Peak || Spacewatch || — || align=right data-sort-value="0.69" | 690 m || 
|-id=695 bgcolor=#fefefe
| 463695 ||  || — || February 3, 2008 || Kitt Peak || Spacewatch || H || align=right data-sort-value="0.49" | 490 m || 
|-id=696 bgcolor=#E9E9E9
| 463696 ||  || — || September 15, 2006 || Kitt Peak || Spacewatch || (5) || align=right data-sort-value="0.69" | 690 m || 
|-id=697 bgcolor=#fefefe
| 463697 ||  || — || January 13, 2013 || Catalina || CSS || H || align=right data-sort-value="0.52" | 520 m || 
|-id=698 bgcolor=#fefefe
| 463698 ||  || — || October 16, 2003 || Palomar || NEAT || — || align=right data-sort-value="0.74" | 740 m || 
|-id=699 bgcolor=#E9E9E9
| 463699 ||  || — || December 27, 2002 || Socorro || LINEAR || — || align=right | 1.1 km || 
|-id=700 bgcolor=#fefefe
| 463700 ||  || — || November 5, 2007 || Kitt Peak || Spacewatch || MAS || align=right data-sort-value="0.59" | 590 m || 
|}

463701–463800 

|-bgcolor=#fefefe
| 463701 ||  || — || October 20, 2003 || Socorro || LINEAR || NYS || align=right data-sort-value="0.73" | 730 m || 
|-id=702 bgcolor=#fefefe
| 463702 ||  || — || February 3, 2009 || Kitt Peak || Spacewatch || — || align=right data-sort-value="0.75" | 750 m || 
|-id=703 bgcolor=#E9E9E9
| 463703 ||  || — || September 23, 2006 || Siding Spring || SSS || — || align=right | 1.2 km || 
|-id=704 bgcolor=#fefefe
| 463704 ||  || — || September 30, 2003 || Kitt Peak || Spacewatch || — || align=right | 1.0 km || 
|-id=705 bgcolor=#fefefe
| 463705 ||  || — || December 28, 2005 || Mount Lemmon || Mount Lemmon Survey || — || align=right data-sort-value="0.54" | 540 m || 
|-id=706 bgcolor=#E9E9E9
| 463706 ||  || — || September 3, 2010 || Mount Lemmon || Mount Lemmon Survey || EUN || align=right | 1.0 km || 
|-id=707 bgcolor=#E9E9E9
| 463707 ||  || — || December 11, 2001 || Socorro || LINEAR || — || align=right | 1.9 km || 
|-id=708 bgcolor=#E9E9E9
| 463708 ||  || — || September 27, 2005 || Palomar || NEAT || — || align=right | 1.9 km || 
|-id=709 bgcolor=#E9E9E9
| 463709 ||  || — || September 19, 2001 || Apache Point || SDSS || EUN || align=right | 1.1 km || 
|-id=710 bgcolor=#E9E9E9
| 463710 ||  || — || April 30, 2008 || Mount Lemmon || Mount Lemmon Survey || — || align=right | 3.0 km || 
|-id=711 bgcolor=#E9E9E9
| 463711 ||  || — || August 29, 2006 || Kitt Peak || Spacewatch || — || align=right data-sort-value="0.94" | 940 m || 
|-id=712 bgcolor=#E9E9E9
| 463712 ||  || — || August 6, 2010 || WISE || WISE || — || align=right | 1.5 km || 
|-id=713 bgcolor=#fefefe
| 463713 ||  || — || February 27, 2009 || Kitt Peak || Spacewatch || — || align=right data-sort-value="0.57" | 570 m || 
|-id=714 bgcolor=#fefefe
| 463714 ||  || — || February 26, 2009 || Kitt Peak || Spacewatch || — || align=right data-sort-value="0.70" | 700 m || 
|-id=715 bgcolor=#d6d6d6
| 463715 ||  || — || October 19, 2003 || Kitt Peak || Spacewatch || — || align=right | 2.7 km || 
|-id=716 bgcolor=#fefefe
| 463716 ||  || — || January 26, 2006 || Mount Lemmon || Mount Lemmon Survey || — || align=right data-sort-value="0.53" | 530 m || 
|-id=717 bgcolor=#E9E9E9
| 463717 ||  || — || March 14, 1999 || Kitt Peak || Spacewatch || — || align=right | 1.2 km || 
|-id=718 bgcolor=#E9E9E9
| 463718 ||  || — || September 4, 2010 || Mount Lemmon || Mount Lemmon Survey || — || align=right data-sort-value="0.71" | 710 m || 
|-id=719 bgcolor=#E9E9E9
| 463719 ||  || — || September 28, 2006 || Kitt Peak || Spacewatch || — || align=right data-sort-value="0.82" | 820 m || 
|-id=720 bgcolor=#fefefe
| 463720 ||  || — || March 1, 2009 || Kitt Peak || Spacewatch || — || align=right data-sort-value="0.63" | 630 m || 
|-id=721 bgcolor=#E9E9E9
| 463721 ||  || — || October 10, 2002 || Apache Point || SDSS || — || align=right | 1.3 km || 
|-id=722 bgcolor=#fefefe
| 463722 ||  || — || November 8, 2007 || Mount Lemmon || Mount Lemmon Survey || NYS || align=right data-sort-value="0.70" | 700 m || 
|-id=723 bgcolor=#fefefe
| 463723 ||  || — || December 20, 2000 || Kitt Peak || Spacewatch || — || align=right data-sort-value="0.86" | 860 m || 
|-id=724 bgcolor=#E9E9E9
| 463724 ||  || — || January 21, 2012 || Haleakala || Pan-STARRS || MAR || align=right | 1.4 km || 
|-id=725 bgcolor=#fefefe
| 463725 ||  || — || May 4, 2010 || Kitt Peak || Spacewatch || — || align=right data-sort-value="0.94" | 940 m || 
|-id=726 bgcolor=#fefefe
| 463726 ||  || — || March 2, 2006 || Kitt Peak || Spacewatch || V || align=right data-sort-value="0.56" | 560 m || 
|-id=727 bgcolor=#fefefe
| 463727 ||  || — || November 29, 2000 || Socorro || LINEAR || — || align=right data-sort-value="0.84" | 840 m || 
|-id=728 bgcolor=#fefefe
| 463728 ||  || — || January 16, 2005 || Kitt Peak || Spacewatch || — || align=right data-sort-value="0.53" | 530 m || 
|-id=729 bgcolor=#fefefe
| 463729 ||  || — || September 11, 2007 || Mount Lemmon || Mount Lemmon Survey || — || align=right data-sort-value="0.56" | 560 m || 
|-id=730 bgcolor=#d6d6d6
| 463730 ||  || — || April 27, 2012 || Kitt Peak || Spacewatch || — || align=right | 3.4 km || 
|-id=731 bgcolor=#fefefe
| 463731 ||  || — || September 23, 2000 || Anderson Mesa || LONEOS || — || align=right data-sort-value="0.73" | 730 m || 
|-id=732 bgcolor=#fefefe
| 463732 ||  || — || December 15, 2004 || Kitt Peak || Spacewatch || — || align=right data-sort-value="0.85" | 850 m || 
|-id=733 bgcolor=#fefefe
| 463733 ||  || — || February 21, 2009 || Kitt Peak || Spacewatch || — || align=right data-sort-value="0.83" | 830 m || 
|-id=734 bgcolor=#fefefe
| 463734 ||  || — || January 27, 2006 || Mount Lemmon || Mount Lemmon Survey || — || align=right data-sort-value="0.84" | 840 m || 
|-id=735 bgcolor=#fefefe
| 463735 ||  || — || September 11, 2007 || Mount Lemmon || Mount Lemmon Survey || V || align=right data-sort-value="0.41" | 410 m || 
|-id=736 bgcolor=#E9E9E9
| 463736 ||  || — || August 25, 2014 || Haleakala || Pan-STARRS || — || align=right | 1.5 km || 
|-id=737 bgcolor=#fefefe
| 463737 ||  || — || January 31, 2009 || Mount Lemmon || Mount Lemmon Survey || V || align=right data-sort-value="0.53" | 530 m || 
|-id=738 bgcolor=#fefefe
| 463738 ||  || — || February 26, 2009 || Catalina || CSS || — || align=right data-sort-value="0.73" | 730 m || 
|-id=739 bgcolor=#fefefe
| 463739 ||  || — || August 11, 2007 || Anderson Mesa || LONEOS || — || align=right data-sort-value="0.64" | 640 m || 
|-id=740 bgcolor=#fefefe
| 463740 ||  || — || February 1, 2009 || Kitt Peak || Spacewatch || — || align=right data-sort-value="0.67" | 670 m || 
|-id=741 bgcolor=#fefefe
| 463741 ||  || — || October 8, 2007 || Mount Lemmon || Mount Lemmon Survey || — || align=right data-sort-value="0.69" | 690 m || 
|-id=742 bgcolor=#fefefe
| 463742 ||  || — || September 30, 2006 || Mount Lemmon || Mount Lemmon Survey || H || align=right data-sort-value="0.50" | 500 m || 
|-id=743 bgcolor=#fefefe
| 463743 ||  || — || February 22, 2009 || Kitt Peak || Spacewatch || V || align=right data-sort-value="0.66" | 660 m || 
|-id=744 bgcolor=#E9E9E9
| 463744 ||  || — || August 19, 2006 || Kitt Peak || Spacewatch || — || align=right data-sort-value="0.78" | 780 m || 
|-id=745 bgcolor=#fefefe
| 463745 ||  || — || November 6, 2004 || Palomar || NEAT || — || align=right | 1.0 km || 
|-id=746 bgcolor=#fefefe
| 463746 ||  || — || April 22, 2007 || Kitt Peak || Spacewatch || — || align=right data-sort-value="0.65" | 650 m || 
|-id=747 bgcolor=#E9E9E9
| 463747 ||  || — || September 30, 2005 || Mount Lemmon || Mount Lemmon Survey || — || align=right | 1.4 km || 
|-id=748 bgcolor=#E9E9E9
| 463748 ||  || — || December 2, 2010 || Mount Lemmon || Mount Lemmon Survey || (5) || align=right data-sort-value="0.96" | 960 m || 
|-id=749 bgcolor=#fefefe
| 463749 ||  || — || July 26, 2011 || Siding Spring || SSS || H || align=right | 1.0 km || 
|-id=750 bgcolor=#fefefe
| 463750 ||  || — || October 18, 2003 || Kitt Peak || Spacewatch || — || align=right data-sort-value="0.65" | 650 m || 
|-id=751 bgcolor=#fefefe
| 463751 ||  || — || September 5, 1999 || Kitt Peak || Spacewatch || — || align=right data-sort-value="0.90" | 900 m || 
|-id=752 bgcolor=#fefefe
| 463752 ||  || — || December 5, 2007 || Mount Lemmon || Mount Lemmon Survey || MAS || align=right data-sort-value="0.60" | 600 m || 
|-id=753 bgcolor=#fefefe
| 463753 ||  || — || November 5, 2007 || Kitt Peak || Spacewatch || — || align=right data-sort-value="0.62" | 620 m || 
|-id=754 bgcolor=#E9E9E9
| 463754 ||  || — || September 30, 2005 || Mount Lemmon || Mount Lemmon Survey || — || align=right | 2.0 km || 
|-id=755 bgcolor=#fefefe
| 463755 ||  || — || September 25, 2006 || Kitt Peak || Spacewatch || H || align=right data-sort-value="0.41" | 410 m || 
|-id=756 bgcolor=#E9E9E9
| 463756 ||  || — || January 17, 2007 || Kitt Peak || Spacewatch || — || align=right | 2.8 km || 
|-id=757 bgcolor=#d6d6d6
| 463757 ||  || — || April 11, 2010 || WISE || WISE || — || align=right | 2.7 km || 
|-id=758 bgcolor=#E9E9E9
| 463758 ||  || — || October 27, 2005 || Palomar || NEAT || — || align=right | 2.0 km || 
|-id=759 bgcolor=#fefefe
| 463759 ||  || — || January 17, 2005 || Kitt Peak || Spacewatch || NYS || align=right data-sort-value="0.67" | 670 m || 
|-id=760 bgcolor=#fefefe
| 463760 ||  || — || March 9, 2006 || Kitt Peak || Spacewatch || — || align=right data-sort-value="0.58" | 580 m || 
|-id=761 bgcolor=#E9E9E9
| 463761 ||  || — || January 4, 2011 || Mount Lemmon || Mount Lemmon Survey || — || align=right | 1.5 km || 
|-id=762 bgcolor=#fefefe
| 463762 ||  || — || November 10, 2004 || Kitt Peak || Spacewatch || — || align=right data-sort-value="0.67" | 670 m || 
|-id=763 bgcolor=#fefefe
| 463763 ||  || — || April 22, 2009 || Mount Lemmon || Mount Lemmon Survey || NYS || align=right data-sort-value="0.59" | 590 m || 
|-id=764 bgcolor=#fefefe
| 463764 ||  || — || October 11, 2007 || Mount Lemmon || Mount Lemmon Survey || — || align=right data-sort-value="0.64" | 640 m || 
|-id=765 bgcolor=#E9E9E9
| 463765 ||  || — || December 15, 2006 || Kitt Peak || Spacewatch || MIS || align=right | 2.1 km || 
|-id=766 bgcolor=#E9E9E9
| 463766 ||  || — || February 28, 2008 || Mount Lemmon || Mount Lemmon Survey || — || align=right data-sort-value="0.73" | 730 m || 
|-id=767 bgcolor=#d6d6d6
| 463767 ||  || — || September 16, 2009 || Kitt Peak || Spacewatch || — || align=right | 2.6 km || 
|-id=768 bgcolor=#E9E9E9
| 463768 ||  || — || September 22, 2009 || Mount Lemmon || Mount Lemmon Survey || HOF || align=right | 2.6 km || 
|-id=769 bgcolor=#fefefe
| 463769 ||  || — || October 4, 2007 || Catalina || CSS || V || align=right data-sort-value="0.72" | 720 m || 
|-id=770 bgcolor=#E9E9E9
| 463770 ||  || — || October 17, 2010 || Mount Lemmon || Mount Lemmon Survey || — || align=right | 1.5 km || 
|-id=771 bgcolor=#E9E9E9
| 463771 ||  || — || March 13, 2012 || Mount Lemmon || Mount Lemmon Survey || — || align=right | 2.3 km || 
|-id=772 bgcolor=#E9E9E9
| 463772 ||  || — || March 6, 2008 || Mount Lemmon || Mount Lemmon Survey || (5) || align=right data-sort-value="0.89" | 890 m || 
|-id=773 bgcolor=#fefefe
| 463773 ||  || — || March 23, 2006 || Kitt Peak || Spacewatch || — || align=right data-sort-value="0.69" | 690 m || 
|-id=774 bgcolor=#fefefe
| 463774 ||  || — || December 14, 2001 || Kitt Peak || Spacewatch || — || align=right data-sort-value="0.71" | 710 m || 
|-id=775 bgcolor=#fefefe
| 463775 ||  || — || January 31, 2009 || Mount Lemmon || Mount Lemmon Survey || — || align=right data-sort-value="0.60" | 600 m || 
|-id=776 bgcolor=#E9E9E9
| 463776 ||  || — || April 7, 2008 || Mount Lemmon || Mount Lemmon Survey || — || align=right | 1.5 km || 
|-id=777 bgcolor=#d6d6d6
| 463777 ||  || — || January 29, 2011 || Kitt Peak || Spacewatch || TEL || align=right | 1.4 km || 
|-id=778 bgcolor=#E9E9E9
| 463778 ||  || — || February 8, 2007 || Mount Lemmon || Mount Lemmon Survey || — || align=right | 1.9 km || 
|-id=779 bgcolor=#E9E9E9
| 463779 ||  || — || September 16, 2009 || Mount Lemmon || Mount Lemmon Survey || EUN || align=right | 1.3 km || 
|-id=780 bgcolor=#E9E9E9
| 463780 ||  || — || August 6, 2005 || Palomar || NEAT || — || align=right | 2.1 km || 
|-id=781 bgcolor=#E9E9E9
| 463781 ||  || — || October 29, 2010 || Mount Lemmon || Mount Lemmon Survey || — || align=right | 1.4 km || 
|-id=782 bgcolor=#fefefe
| 463782 ||  || — || August 28, 2000 || Cerro Tololo || M. W. Buie || — || align=right data-sort-value="0.64" | 640 m || 
|-id=783 bgcolor=#fefefe
| 463783 ||  || — || September 1, 2010 || Mount Lemmon || Mount Lemmon Survey || NYS || align=right data-sort-value="0.60" | 600 m || 
|-id=784 bgcolor=#d6d6d6
| 463784 ||  || — || September 28, 2003 || Socorro || LINEAR || — || align=right | 3.0 km || 
|-id=785 bgcolor=#d6d6d6
| 463785 ||  || — || September 28, 2003 || Kitt Peak || Spacewatch || THM || align=right | 1.8 km || 
|-id=786 bgcolor=#E9E9E9
| 463786 ||  || — || March 12, 2003 || Palomar || NEAT || — || align=right | 1.3 km || 
|-id=787 bgcolor=#E9E9E9
| 463787 ||  || — || December 26, 2006 || Kitt Peak || Spacewatch || — || align=right | 2.4 km || 
|-id=788 bgcolor=#fefefe
| 463788 ||  || — || December 5, 2007 || Kitt Peak || Spacewatch || — || align=right data-sort-value="0.78" | 780 m || 
|-id=789 bgcolor=#E9E9E9
| 463789 ||  || — || April 24, 2003 || Kitt Peak || Spacewatch || GEF || align=right | 1.3 km || 
|-id=790 bgcolor=#d6d6d6
| 463790 ||  || — || September 22, 2003 || Palomar || NEAT || — || align=right | 4.0 km || 
|-id=791 bgcolor=#d6d6d6
| 463791 ||  || — || November 9, 2009 || Catalina || CSS || — || align=right | 1.8 km || 
|-id=792 bgcolor=#E9E9E9
| 463792 ||  || — || November 24, 2006 || Mount Lemmon || Mount Lemmon Survey || — || align=right | 2.6 km || 
|-id=793 bgcolor=#E9E9E9
| 463793 ||  || — || February 6, 2007 || Mount Lemmon || Mount Lemmon Survey || MRX || align=right data-sort-value="0.92" | 920 m || 
|-id=794 bgcolor=#E9E9E9
| 463794 ||  || — || October 9, 2005 || Kitt Peak || Spacewatch || — || align=right | 1.9 km || 
|-id=795 bgcolor=#E9E9E9
| 463795 ||  || — || March 29, 2012 || Mount Lemmon || Mount Lemmon Survey || ADE || align=right | 1.8 km || 
|-id=796 bgcolor=#E9E9E9
| 463796 ||  || — || October 7, 2005 || Kitt Peak || Spacewatch || — || align=right | 1.5 km || 
|-id=797 bgcolor=#E9E9E9
| 463797 ||  || — || November 10, 2005 || Catalina || CSS || — || align=right | 2.8 km || 
|-id=798 bgcolor=#E9E9E9
| 463798 ||  || — || September 30, 2005 || Catalina || CSS || MRX || align=right | 1.2 km || 
|-id=799 bgcolor=#E9E9E9
| 463799 ||  || — || October 31, 2010 || Kitt Peak || Spacewatch || (5) || align=right data-sort-value="0.68" | 680 m || 
|-id=800 bgcolor=#E9E9E9
| 463800 ||  || — || November 22, 2006 || Kitt Peak || Spacewatch || — || align=right data-sort-value="0.97" | 970 m || 
|}

463801–463900 

|-bgcolor=#fefefe
| 463801 ||  || — || February 14, 2005 || Kitt Peak || Spacewatch || — || align=right data-sort-value="0.71" | 710 m || 
|-id=802 bgcolor=#d6d6d6
| 463802 ||  || — || November 23, 2009 || Mount Lemmon || Mount Lemmon Survey || EOS || align=right | 1.9 km || 
|-id=803 bgcolor=#E9E9E9
| 463803 ||  || — || February 22, 2007 || Catalina || CSS || — || align=right | 2.8 km || 
|-id=804 bgcolor=#E9E9E9
| 463804 ||  || — || March 16, 2007 || Mount Lemmon || Mount Lemmon Survey || — || align=right | 1.8 km || 
|-id=805 bgcolor=#E9E9E9
| 463805 ||  || — || April 6, 2008 || Mount Lemmon || Mount Lemmon Survey || — || align=right | 1.3 km || 
|-id=806 bgcolor=#E9E9E9
| 463806 ||  || — || March 10, 2008 || Kitt Peak || Spacewatch || — || align=right | 1.1 km || 
|-id=807 bgcolor=#E9E9E9
| 463807 ||  || — || March 31, 2008 || Mount Lemmon || Mount Lemmon Survey || — || align=right | 1.1 km || 
|-id=808 bgcolor=#E9E9E9
| 463808 ||  || — || March 29, 2008 || Kitt Peak || Spacewatch || — || align=right | 1.5 km || 
|-id=809 bgcolor=#E9E9E9
| 463809 ||  || — || September 25, 2005 || Kitt Peak || Spacewatch || — || align=right | 1.8 km || 
|-id=810 bgcolor=#fefefe
| 463810 ||  || — || December 16, 2007 || Kitt Peak || Spacewatch || — || align=right data-sort-value="0.94" | 940 m || 
|-id=811 bgcolor=#E9E9E9
| 463811 ||  || — || October 29, 2005 || Kitt Peak || Spacewatch || — || align=right | 2.0 km || 
|-id=812 bgcolor=#fefefe
| 463812 ||  || — || March 10, 2002 || Kitt Peak || Spacewatch || V || align=right data-sort-value="0.58" | 580 m || 
|-id=813 bgcolor=#d6d6d6
| 463813 ||  || — || March 27, 2010 || WISE || WISE || — || align=right | 2.2 km || 
|-id=814 bgcolor=#E9E9E9
| 463814 ||  || — || April 6, 2008 || Kitt Peak || Spacewatch || — || align=right | 1.2 km || 
|-id=815 bgcolor=#E9E9E9
| 463815 ||  || — || October 24, 2005 || Kitt Peak || Spacewatch || — || align=right | 1.9 km || 
|-id=816 bgcolor=#E9E9E9
| 463816 ||  || — || November 2, 2006 || Mount Lemmon || Mount Lemmon Survey || (5) || align=right data-sort-value="0.86" | 860 m || 
|-id=817 bgcolor=#E9E9E9
| 463817 ||  || — || September 11, 2010 || Mount Lemmon || Mount Lemmon Survey || — || align=right data-sort-value="0.76" | 760 m || 
|-id=818 bgcolor=#d6d6d6
| 463818 ||  || — || March 10, 2011 || Mount Lemmon || Mount Lemmon Survey || — || align=right | 2.4 km || 
|-id=819 bgcolor=#d6d6d6
| 463819 ||  || — || March 28, 2012 || Mount Lemmon || Mount Lemmon Survey || — || align=right | 2.7 km || 
|-id=820 bgcolor=#fefefe
| 463820 ||  || — || November 20, 2006 || Mount Lemmon || Mount Lemmon Survey || H || align=right data-sort-value="0.94" | 940 m || 
|-id=821 bgcolor=#E9E9E9
| 463821 ||  || — || October 13, 2010 || Mount Lemmon || Mount Lemmon Survey || — || align=right data-sort-value="0.80" | 800 m || 
|-id=822 bgcolor=#d6d6d6
| 463822 ||  || — || October 2, 2003 || Kitt Peak || Spacewatch || THM || align=right | 2.3 km || 
|-id=823 bgcolor=#d6d6d6
| 463823 ||  || — || September 29, 2003 || Kitt Peak || Spacewatch || — || align=right | 4.2 km || 
|-id=824 bgcolor=#E9E9E9
| 463824 ||  || — || September 19, 2009 || Mount Lemmon || Mount Lemmon Survey || DOR || align=right | 2.4 km || 
|-id=825 bgcolor=#E9E9E9
| 463825 ||  || — || October 13, 2006 || Kitt Peak || Spacewatch || — || align=right data-sort-value="0.90" | 900 m || 
|-id=826 bgcolor=#E9E9E9
| 463826 ||  || — || December 5, 2010 || Mount Lemmon || Mount Lemmon Survey || (5) || align=right data-sort-value="0.85" | 850 m || 
|-id=827 bgcolor=#fefefe
| 463827 ||  || — || October 3, 2006 || Mount Lemmon || Mount Lemmon Survey || — || align=right | 1.1 km || 
|-id=828 bgcolor=#E9E9E9
| 463828 ||  || — || February 28, 2008 || Mount Lemmon || Mount Lemmon Survey || — || align=right data-sort-value="0.99" | 990 m || 
|-id=829 bgcolor=#d6d6d6
| 463829 ||  || — || October 20, 2003 || Kitt Peak || Spacewatch || — || align=right | 2.4 km || 
|-id=830 bgcolor=#d6d6d6
| 463830 ||  || — || March 2, 2011 || Kitt Peak || Spacewatch || — || align=right | 2.4 km || 
|-id=831 bgcolor=#E9E9E9
| 463831 ||  || — || October 28, 2005 || Kitt Peak || Spacewatch || HOF || align=right | 2.3 km || 
|-id=832 bgcolor=#fefefe
| 463832 ||  || — || February 23, 2012 || Catalina || CSS || — || align=right | 1.2 km || 
|-id=833 bgcolor=#E9E9E9
| 463833 ||  || — || September 20, 2001 || Kitt Peak || Spacewatch || JUN || align=right data-sort-value="0.99" | 990 m || 
|-id=834 bgcolor=#E9E9E9
| 463834 ||  || — || January 28, 2007 || Mount Lemmon || Mount Lemmon Survey || — || align=right | 2.0 km || 
|-id=835 bgcolor=#E9E9E9
| 463835 ||  || — || October 29, 2010 || Mount Lemmon || Mount Lemmon Survey || — || align=right data-sort-value="0.98" | 980 m || 
|-id=836 bgcolor=#E9E9E9
| 463836 ||  || — || August 6, 2005 || Palomar || NEAT || — || align=right | 1.0 km || 
|-id=837 bgcolor=#E9E9E9
| 463837 ||  || — || April 7, 2008 || Kitt Peak || Spacewatch || — || align=right | 1.2 km || 
|-id=838 bgcolor=#E9E9E9
| 463838 ||  || — || November 8, 1997 || Caussols || ODAS || — || align=right | 1.7 km || 
|-id=839 bgcolor=#E9E9E9
| 463839 ||  || — || December 8, 2005 || Kitt Peak || Spacewatch || — || align=right | 2.2 km || 
|-id=840 bgcolor=#d6d6d6
| 463840 ||  || — || September 26, 2003 || Apache Point || SDSS || — || align=right | 2.3 km || 
|-id=841 bgcolor=#E9E9E9
| 463841 ||  || — || September 1, 2005 || Kitt Peak || Spacewatch || — || align=right | 1.5 km || 
|-id=842 bgcolor=#E9E9E9
| 463842 ||  || — || January 18, 2008 || Mount Lemmon || Mount Lemmon Survey || — || align=right | 1.1 km || 
|-id=843 bgcolor=#E9E9E9
| 463843 ||  || — || January 28, 2011 || Catalina || CSS || — || align=right | 2.8 km || 
|-id=844 bgcolor=#d6d6d6
| 463844 ||  || — || May 29, 2006 || Kitt Peak || Spacewatch || — || align=right | 3.3 km || 
|-id=845 bgcolor=#d6d6d6
| 463845 ||  || — || November 9, 2009 || Kitt Peak || Spacewatch || — || align=right | 2.5 km || 
|-id=846 bgcolor=#d6d6d6
| 463846 ||  || — || September 18, 2003 || Kitt Peak || Spacewatch || — || align=right | 2.1 km || 
|-id=847 bgcolor=#d6d6d6
| 463847 ||  || — || September 20, 2003 || Kitt Peak || Spacewatch || EOS || align=right | 1.7 km || 
|-id=848 bgcolor=#E9E9E9
| 463848 ||  || — || December 23, 2006 || Mount Lemmon || Mount Lemmon Survey || — || align=right | 1.8 km || 
|-id=849 bgcolor=#E9E9E9
| 463849 ||  || — || October 26, 2005 || Kitt Peak || Spacewatch || — || align=right | 2.2 km || 
|-id=850 bgcolor=#d6d6d6
| 463850 ||  || — || March 17, 2001 || Kitt Peak || Spacewatch || EOS || align=right | 2.1 km || 
|-id=851 bgcolor=#E9E9E9
| 463851 ||  || — || November 12, 2005 || Kitt Peak || Spacewatch || HOF || align=right | 2.6 km || 
|-id=852 bgcolor=#d6d6d6
| 463852 ||  || — || March 2, 2006 || Mount Lemmon || Mount Lemmon Survey || — || align=right | 3.6 km || 
|-id=853 bgcolor=#E9E9E9
| 463853 ||  || — || June 9, 2012 || Mount Lemmon || Mount Lemmon Survey || — || align=right | 2.0 km || 
|-id=854 bgcolor=#d6d6d6
| 463854 ||  || — || October 22, 2009 || Mount Lemmon || Mount Lemmon Survey || — || align=right | 2.5 km || 
|-id=855 bgcolor=#fefefe
| 463855 ||  || — || October 8, 2007 || Catalina || CSS || — || align=right data-sort-value="0.76" | 760 m || 
|-id=856 bgcolor=#d6d6d6
| 463856 ||  || — || February 5, 2011 || Catalina || CSS || EOS || align=right | 2.1 km || 
|-id=857 bgcolor=#fefefe
| 463857 ||  || — || January 13, 2008 || Mount Lemmon || Mount Lemmon Survey || CLA || align=right | 1.5 km || 
|-id=858 bgcolor=#E9E9E9
| 463858 ||  || — || March 22, 2012 || Mount Lemmon || Mount Lemmon Survey || — || align=right | 1.4 km || 
|-id=859 bgcolor=#fefefe
| 463859 ||  || — || February 8, 2002 || Kitt Peak || Spacewatch || — || align=right data-sort-value="0.94" | 940 m || 
|-id=860 bgcolor=#E9E9E9
| 463860 ||  || — || November 17, 2006 || Kitt Peak || Spacewatch || — || align=right | 1.0 km || 
|-id=861 bgcolor=#d6d6d6
| 463861 ||  || — || November 23, 2009 || Mount Lemmon || Mount Lemmon Survey || — || align=right | 2.6 km || 
|-id=862 bgcolor=#d6d6d6
| 463862 ||  || — || November 16, 2009 || Mount Lemmon || Mount Lemmon Survey || — || align=right | 2.6 km || 
|-id=863 bgcolor=#fefefe
| 463863 ||  || — || October 11, 2007 || Catalina || CSS || — || align=right data-sort-value="0.75" | 750 m || 
|-id=864 bgcolor=#E9E9E9
| 463864 ||  || — || December 18, 2001 || Socorro || LINEAR || — || align=right | 2.2 km || 
|-id=865 bgcolor=#E9E9E9
| 463865 ||  || — || November 7, 2010 || Mount Lemmon || Mount Lemmon Survey || — || align=right | 1.5 km || 
|-id=866 bgcolor=#d6d6d6
| 463866 ||  || — || January 10, 2011 || Mount Lemmon || Mount Lemmon Survey || EOS || align=right | 2.3 km || 
|-id=867 bgcolor=#E9E9E9
| 463867 ||  || — || October 29, 2005 || Kitt Peak || Spacewatch || NEM || align=right | 2.0 km || 
|-id=868 bgcolor=#d6d6d6
| 463868 ||  || — || July 29, 2008 || Mount Lemmon || Mount Lemmon Survey || — || align=right | 2.2 km || 
|-id=869 bgcolor=#E9E9E9
| 463869 ||  || — || August 20, 2004 || Kitt Peak || Spacewatch || HOF || align=right | 2.4 km || 
|-id=870 bgcolor=#E9E9E9
| 463870 ||  || — || October 5, 2005 || Kitt Peak || Spacewatch || — || align=right | 1.6 km || 
|-id=871 bgcolor=#E9E9E9
| 463871 ||  || — || December 7, 2005 || Kitt Peak || Spacewatch || — || align=right | 1.9 km || 
|-id=872 bgcolor=#fefefe
| 463872 ||  || — || April 28, 2006 || Cerro Tololo || M. W. Buie || — || align=right data-sort-value="0.80" | 800 m || 
|-id=873 bgcolor=#fefefe
| 463873 ||  || — || January 26, 2006 || Mount Lemmon || Mount Lemmon Survey || — || align=right data-sort-value="0.76" | 760 m || 
|-id=874 bgcolor=#E9E9E9
| 463874 ||  || — || March 5, 2008 || Mount Lemmon || Mount Lemmon Survey || — || align=right data-sort-value="0.84" | 840 m || 
|-id=875 bgcolor=#E9E9E9
| 463875 ||  || — || October 1, 2005 || Mount Lemmon || Mount Lemmon Survey || WIT || align=right | 1.1 km || 
|-id=876 bgcolor=#d6d6d6
| 463876 ||  || — || October 23, 2003 || Kitt Peak || Spacewatch || EOS || align=right | 1.9 km || 
|-id=877 bgcolor=#d6d6d6
| 463877 ||  || — || November 18, 2009 || Kitt Peak || Spacewatch || — || align=right | 2.6 km || 
|-id=878 bgcolor=#d6d6d6
| 463878 ||  || — || September 20, 2003 || Palomar || NEAT || — || align=right | 2.7 km || 
|-id=879 bgcolor=#E9E9E9
| 463879 ||  || — || September 19, 2001 || Kitt Peak || Spacewatch || — || align=right data-sort-value="0.91" | 910 m || 
|-id=880 bgcolor=#fefefe
| 463880 ||  || — || June 4, 2013 || Mount Lemmon || Mount Lemmon Survey || — || align=right | 1.00 km || 
|-id=881 bgcolor=#E9E9E9
| 463881 ||  || — || October 30, 2005 || Kitt Peak || Spacewatch || — || align=right | 1.9 km || 
|-id=882 bgcolor=#d6d6d6
| 463882 ||  || — || September 25, 2003 || Palomar || NEAT || — || align=right | 2.5 km || 
|-id=883 bgcolor=#fefefe
| 463883 ||  || — || February 27, 2012 || Catalina || CSS || — || align=right | 1.1 km || 
|-id=884 bgcolor=#d6d6d6
| 463884 ||  || — || November 18, 2003 || Kitt Peak || Spacewatch || — || align=right | 2.7 km || 
|-id=885 bgcolor=#E9E9E9
| 463885 ||  || — || January 28, 2007 || Kitt Peak || Spacewatch || — || align=right | 1.8 km || 
|-id=886 bgcolor=#d6d6d6
| 463886 ||  || — || February 22, 2001 || Nogales || P. R. Holvorcem, M. Schwartz || KOR || align=right | 1.5 km || 
|-id=887 bgcolor=#E9E9E9
| 463887 ||  || — || November 24, 2006 || Kitt Peak || Spacewatch || — || align=right data-sort-value="0.94" | 940 m || 
|-id=888 bgcolor=#E9E9E9
| 463888 ||  || — || October 21, 2006 || Kitt Peak || Spacewatch || — || align=right | 1.2 km || 
|-id=889 bgcolor=#E9E9E9
| 463889 ||  || — || December 5, 2010 || Kitt Peak || Spacewatch || — || align=right | 1.9 km || 
|-id=890 bgcolor=#fefefe
| 463890 ||  || — || September 15, 1998 || Kitt Peak || Spacewatch || — || align=right data-sort-value="0.56" | 560 m || 
|-id=891 bgcolor=#E9E9E9
| 463891 ||  || — || August 10, 2010 || Kitt Peak || Spacewatch || (5) || align=right data-sort-value="0.91" | 910 m || 
|-id=892 bgcolor=#E9E9E9
| 463892 ||  || — || August 31, 2005 || Kitt Peak || Spacewatch || — || align=right | 1.2 km || 
|-id=893 bgcolor=#d6d6d6
| 463893 ||  || — || May 23, 2012 || Mount Lemmon || Mount Lemmon Survey || EOS || align=right | 1.8 km || 
|-id=894 bgcolor=#fefefe
| 463894 ||  || — || October 14, 2007 || Mount Lemmon || Mount Lemmon Survey || — || align=right data-sort-value="0.92" | 920 m || 
|-id=895 bgcolor=#E9E9E9
| 463895 ||  || — || October 24, 2001 || Kitt Peak || Spacewatch || — || align=right | 1.7 km || 
|-id=896 bgcolor=#E9E9E9
| 463896 ||  || — || October 14, 2001 || Apache Point || SDSS || — || align=right | 1.3 km || 
|-id=897 bgcolor=#E9E9E9
| 463897 ||  || — || February 25, 2007 || Kitt Peak || Spacewatch || HOF || align=right | 2.3 km || 
|-id=898 bgcolor=#fefefe
| 463898 ||  || — || March 29, 2009 || Kitt Peak || Spacewatch || — || align=right data-sort-value="0.92" | 920 m || 
|-id=899 bgcolor=#E9E9E9
| 463899 ||  || — || December 4, 2010 || Mount Lemmon || Mount Lemmon Survey || — || align=right | 1.5 km || 
|-id=900 bgcolor=#E9E9E9
| 463900 ||  || — || August 10, 2004 || Campo Imperatore || CINEOS || AGN || align=right | 1.2 km || 
|}

463901–464000 

|-bgcolor=#E9E9E9
| 463901 ||  || — || May 4, 2008 || Kitt Peak || Spacewatch || — || align=right | 2.4 km || 
|-id=902 bgcolor=#fefefe
| 463902 ||  || — || November 29, 2011 || Kitt Peak || Spacewatch || — || align=right | 1.1 km || 
|-id=903 bgcolor=#E9E9E9
| 463903 ||  || — || September 18, 2010 || Mount Lemmon || Mount Lemmon Survey || (5) || align=right data-sort-value="0.87" | 870 m || 
|-id=904 bgcolor=#E9E9E9
| 463904 ||  || — || November 8, 2010 || Catalina || CSS || EUN || align=right | 1.1 km || 
|-id=905 bgcolor=#fefefe
| 463905 ||  || — || October 4, 2007 || Kitt Peak || Spacewatch || — || align=right data-sort-value="0.67" | 670 m || 
|-id=906 bgcolor=#fefefe
| 463906 ||  || — || April 17, 2005 || Kitt Peak || Spacewatch || — || align=right data-sort-value="0.78" | 780 m || 
|-id=907 bgcolor=#E9E9E9
| 463907 ||  || — || March 20, 1999 || Apache Point || SDSS || — || align=right | 1.3 km || 
|-id=908 bgcolor=#E9E9E9
| 463908 ||  || — || September 3, 2005 || Palomar || NEAT || — || align=right | 2.7 km || 
|-id=909 bgcolor=#d6d6d6
| 463909 ||  || — || September 6, 2008 || Mount Lemmon || Mount Lemmon Survey || — || align=right | 2.3 km || 
|-id=910 bgcolor=#E9E9E9
| 463910 ||  || — || March 6, 2008 || Kitt Peak || Spacewatch || — || align=right | 1.2 km || 
|-id=911 bgcolor=#fefefe
| 463911 ||  || — || September 4, 2010 || Kitt Peak || Spacewatch || — || align=right data-sort-value="0.81" | 810 m || 
|-id=912 bgcolor=#E9E9E9
| 463912 ||  || — || March 5, 2002 || Kitt Peak || Spacewatch || DOR || align=right | 1.7 km || 
|-id=913 bgcolor=#d6d6d6
| 463913 ||  || — || April 16, 2010 || WISE || WISE || NAE || align=right | 3.3 km || 
|-id=914 bgcolor=#E9E9E9
| 463914 ||  || — || May 16, 2004 || Siding Spring || SSS || — || align=right | 1.9 km || 
|-id=915 bgcolor=#E9E9E9
| 463915 ||  || — || November 23, 1997 || Kitt Peak || Spacewatch || — || align=right | 1.2 km || 
|-id=916 bgcolor=#E9E9E9
| 463916 ||  || — || May 28, 2000 || Socorro || LINEAR || — || align=right | 1.8 km || 
|-id=917 bgcolor=#E9E9E9
| 463917 ||  || — || August 15, 2009 || Catalina || CSS || — || align=right | 2.7 km || 
|-id=918 bgcolor=#E9E9E9
| 463918 ||  || — || November 25, 2002 || Palomar || NEAT || — || align=right | 1.4 km || 
|-id=919 bgcolor=#E9E9E9
| 463919 ||  || — || October 14, 2010 || Mount Lemmon || Mount Lemmon Survey || — || align=right | 1.1 km || 
|-id=920 bgcolor=#E9E9E9
| 463920 ||  || — || February 22, 2003 || Kitt Peak || Spacewatch || — || align=right | 1.2 km || 
|-id=921 bgcolor=#fefefe
| 463921 ||  || — || April 7, 2013 || Mount Lemmon || Mount Lemmon Survey || — || align=right data-sort-value="0.62" | 620 m || 
|-id=922 bgcolor=#d6d6d6
| 463922 ||  || — || November 19, 2003 || Kitt Peak || Spacewatch || LIX || align=right | 2.9 km || 
|-id=923 bgcolor=#fefefe
| 463923 ||  || — || November 18, 2003 || Kitt Peak || Spacewatch || — || align=right data-sort-value="0.82" | 820 m || 
|-id=924 bgcolor=#E9E9E9
| 463924 ||  || — || January 27, 2007 || Mount Lemmon || Mount Lemmon Survey || AGN || align=right | 1.4 km || 
|-id=925 bgcolor=#d6d6d6
| 463925 ||  || — || November 24, 2009 || Kitt Peak || Spacewatch || — || align=right | 2.4 km || 
|-id=926 bgcolor=#E9E9E9
| 463926 ||  || — || January 13, 2011 || Mount Lemmon || Mount Lemmon Survey || NEM || align=right | 1.6 km || 
|-id=927 bgcolor=#E9E9E9
| 463927 ||  || — || January 10, 2011 || Catalina || CSS || — || align=right | 3.0 km || 
|-id=928 bgcolor=#E9E9E9
| 463928 ||  || — || October 13, 2001 || Socorro || LINEAR || — || align=right | 1.6 km || 
|-id=929 bgcolor=#E9E9E9
| 463929 ||  || — || July 28, 2005 || Palomar || NEAT || EUN || align=right | 1.7 km || 
|-id=930 bgcolor=#fefefe
| 463930 ||  || — || December 20, 2004 || Mount Lemmon || Mount Lemmon Survey || — || align=right data-sort-value="0.69" | 690 m || 
|-id=931 bgcolor=#E9E9E9
| 463931 ||  || — || September 26, 2009 || Mount Lemmon || Mount Lemmon Survey || HOF || align=right | 2.8 km || 
|-id=932 bgcolor=#E9E9E9
| 463932 ||  || — || March 28, 2012 || Mount Lemmon || Mount Lemmon Survey || — || align=right | 1.4 km || 
|-id=933 bgcolor=#d6d6d6
| 463933 ||  || — || January 13, 2005 || Kitt Peak || Spacewatch || — || align=right | 3.2 km || 
|-id=934 bgcolor=#d6d6d6
| 463934 ||  || — || March 24, 2006 || Mount Lemmon || Mount Lemmon Survey || — || align=right | 4.2 km || 
|-id=935 bgcolor=#E9E9E9
| 463935 ||  || — || December 8, 2010 || Kitt Peak || Spacewatch || — || align=right | 1.1 km || 
|-id=936 bgcolor=#E9E9E9
| 463936 ||  || — || July 27, 2005 || Palomar || NEAT || — || align=right | 1.8 km || 
|-id=937 bgcolor=#E9E9E9
| 463937 ||  || — || January 20, 2002 || Kitt Peak || Spacewatch || — || align=right | 2.3 km || 
|-id=938 bgcolor=#E9E9E9
| 463938 ||  || — || November 18, 2006 || Mount Lemmon || Mount Lemmon Survey || — || align=right | 1.4 km || 
|-id=939 bgcolor=#fefefe
| 463939 ||  || — || September 17, 2010 || Mount Lemmon || Mount Lemmon Survey || — || align=right data-sort-value="0.81" | 810 m || 
|-id=940 bgcolor=#d6d6d6
| 463940 ||  || — || October 18, 2003 || Kitt Peak || Spacewatch || — || align=right | 2.9 km || 
|-id=941 bgcolor=#E9E9E9
| 463941 ||  || — || September 16, 2009 || Kitt Peak || Spacewatch || — || align=right | 1.8 km || 
|-id=942 bgcolor=#E9E9E9
| 463942 ||  || — || December 13, 2010 || Mount Lemmon || Mount Lemmon Survey || — || align=right | 1.4 km || 
|-id=943 bgcolor=#E9E9E9
| 463943 ||  || — || April 29, 2012 || Kitt Peak || Spacewatch || — || align=right | 2.3 km || 
|-id=944 bgcolor=#E9E9E9
| 463944 ||  || — || September 21, 2009 || Mount Lemmon || Mount Lemmon Survey || — || align=right | 1.8 km || 
|-id=945 bgcolor=#E9E9E9
| 463945 ||  || — || November 16, 2010 || Mount Lemmon || Mount Lemmon Survey || — || align=right | 1.5 km || 
|-id=946 bgcolor=#fefefe
| 463946 ||  || — || October 11, 2007 || Kitt Peak || Spacewatch || V || align=right data-sort-value="0.54" | 540 m || 
|-id=947 bgcolor=#d6d6d6
| 463947 ||  || — || May 21, 2006 || Kitt Peak || Spacewatch || — || align=right | 3.2 km || 
|-id=948 bgcolor=#d6d6d6
| 463948 ||  || — || January 15, 2005 || Socorro || LINEAR || — || align=right | 3.2 km || 
|-id=949 bgcolor=#fefefe
| 463949 ||  || — || September 13, 2007 || Mount Lemmon || Mount Lemmon Survey || — || align=right data-sort-value="0.81" | 810 m || 
|-id=950 bgcolor=#E9E9E9
| 463950 ||  || — || November 29, 2005 || Kitt Peak || Spacewatch || — || align=right | 2.4 km || 
|-id=951 bgcolor=#d6d6d6
| 463951 ||  || — || December 18, 2003 || Socorro || LINEAR || THB || align=right | 3.5 km || 
|-id=952 bgcolor=#E9E9E9
| 463952 ||  || — || March 21, 2012 || Mount Lemmon || Mount Lemmon Survey || MAR || align=right data-sort-value="0.97" | 970 m || 
|-id=953 bgcolor=#E9E9E9
| 463953 ||  || — || March 15, 2004 || Kitt Peak || Spacewatch || — || align=right data-sort-value="0.95" | 950 m || 
|-id=954 bgcolor=#fefefe
| 463954 ||  || — || September 24, 2003 || Haleakala || NEAT || NYS || align=right data-sort-value="0.60" | 600 m || 
|-id=955 bgcolor=#fefefe
| 463955 ||  || — || March 16, 2005 || Mount Lemmon || Mount Lemmon Survey || — || align=right data-sort-value="0.79" | 790 m || 
|-id=956 bgcolor=#fefefe
| 463956 ||  || — || November 19, 2003 || Kitt Peak || Spacewatch || NYS || align=right data-sort-value="0.67" | 670 m || 
|-id=957 bgcolor=#E9E9E9
| 463957 ||  || — || April 28, 2008 || Mount Lemmon || Mount Lemmon Survey || — || align=right | 2.2 km || 
|-id=958 bgcolor=#d6d6d6
| 463958 ||  || — || September 12, 2002 || Palomar || NEAT || — || align=right | 3.4 km || 
|-id=959 bgcolor=#d6d6d6
| 463959 ||  || — || October 20, 2003 || Socorro || LINEAR || — || align=right | 3.6 km || 
|-id=960 bgcolor=#d6d6d6
| 463960 ||  || — || September 19, 2009 || Mount Lemmon || Mount Lemmon Survey || — || align=right | 2.1 km || 
|-id=961 bgcolor=#d6d6d6
| 463961 ||  || — || April 30, 2000 || Kitt Peak || Spacewatch || — || align=right | 3.2 km || 
|-id=962 bgcolor=#d6d6d6
| 463962 ||  || — || February 7, 2006 || Kitt Peak || Spacewatch || EOS || align=right | 2.3 km || 
|-id=963 bgcolor=#d6d6d6
| 463963 ||  || — || September 24, 2008 || Mount Lemmon || Mount Lemmon Survey || VER || align=right | 2.6 km || 
|-id=964 bgcolor=#d6d6d6
| 463964 ||  || — || September 28, 2003 || Apache Point || SDSS || — || align=right | 2.6 km || 
|-id=965 bgcolor=#E9E9E9
| 463965 ||  || — || November 21, 2005 || Kitt Peak || Spacewatch || — || align=right | 2.1 km || 
|-id=966 bgcolor=#d6d6d6
| 463966 ||  || — || September 23, 2008 || Catalina || CSS || THB || align=right | 3.7 km || 
|-id=967 bgcolor=#d6d6d6
| 463967 ||  || — || October 28, 2008 || Mount Lemmon || Mount Lemmon Survey || VER || align=right | 2.7 km || 
|-id=968 bgcolor=#fefefe
| 463968 ||  || — || August 31, 2002 || Anderson Mesa || LONEOS || NYS || align=right data-sort-value="0.88" | 880 m || 
|-id=969 bgcolor=#d6d6d6
| 463969 ||  || — || September 28, 2003 || Kitt Peak || Spacewatch || — || align=right | 2.6 km || 
|-id=970 bgcolor=#d6d6d6
| 463970 ||  || — || March 28, 2011 || Catalina || CSS || — || align=right | 3.4 km || 
|-id=971 bgcolor=#fefefe
| 463971 ||  || — || December 16, 2011 || Mount Lemmon || Mount Lemmon Survey || — || align=right data-sort-value="0.81" | 810 m || 
|-id=972 bgcolor=#E9E9E9
| 463972 ||  || — || May 12, 2013 || Mount Lemmon || Mount Lemmon Survey || — || align=right | 1.5 km || 
|-id=973 bgcolor=#E9E9E9
| 463973 ||  || — || January 29, 2011 || Mount Lemmon || Mount Lemmon Survey || AGN || align=right | 1.2 km || 
|-id=974 bgcolor=#E9E9E9
| 463974 ||  || — || October 21, 2006 || Kitt Peak || Spacewatch || — || align=right | 1.0 km || 
|-id=975 bgcolor=#d6d6d6
| 463975 ||  || — || December 28, 2003 || Socorro || LINEAR || — || align=right | 3.3 km || 
|-id=976 bgcolor=#E9E9E9
| 463976 ||  || — || September 19, 2009 || Kitt Peak || Spacewatch || — || align=right | 2.1 km || 
|-id=977 bgcolor=#E9E9E9
| 463977 ||  || — || October 4, 2006 || Mount Lemmon || Mount Lemmon Survey || — || align=right | 1.1 km || 
|-id=978 bgcolor=#fefefe
| 463978 ||  || — || September 19, 2006 || Kitt Peak || Spacewatch || — || align=right | 1.0 km || 
|-id=979 bgcolor=#d6d6d6
| 463979 ||  || — || November 18, 2003 || Kitt Peak || Spacewatch || — || align=right | 2.6 km || 
|-id=980 bgcolor=#fefefe
| 463980 ||  || — || September 11, 2004 || Kitt Peak || Spacewatch || — || align=right data-sort-value="0.62" | 620 m || 
|-id=981 bgcolor=#d6d6d6
| 463981 ||  || — || February 14, 2010 || Catalina || CSS || — || align=right | 2.9 km || 
|-id=982 bgcolor=#d6d6d6
| 463982 ||  || — || November 26, 2009 || Mount Lemmon || Mount Lemmon Survey || — || align=right | 2.3 km || 
|-id=983 bgcolor=#E9E9E9
| 463983 ||  || — || April 6, 2008 || Kitt Peak || Spacewatch || — || align=right | 1.2 km || 
|-id=984 bgcolor=#fefefe
| 463984 ||  || — || February 23, 2012 || Mount Lemmon || Mount Lemmon Survey || V || align=right data-sort-value="0.73" | 730 m || 
|-id=985 bgcolor=#d6d6d6
| 463985 ||  || — || January 31, 2006 || Kitt Peak || Spacewatch || KOR || align=right | 1.2 km || 
|-id=986 bgcolor=#d6d6d6
| 463986 ||  || — || November 16, 2009 || Mount Lemmon || Mount Lemmon Survey || KOR || align=right | 1.2 km || 
|-id=987 bgcolor=#E9E9E9
| 463987 ||  || — || October 1, 2005 || Mount Lemmon || Mount Lemmon Survey || WIT || align=right data-sort-value="0.91" | 910 m || 
|-id=988 bgcolor=#d6d6d6
| 463988 ||  || — || January 26, 2006 || Mount Lemmon || Mount Lemmon Survey || KOR || align=right | 1.2 km || 
|-id=989 bgcolor=#E9E9E9
| 463989 ||  || — || February 8, 2007 || Kitt Peak || Spacewatch || — || align=right | 1.6 km || 
|-id=990 bgcolor=#E9E9E9
| 463990 ||  || — || October 9, 1993 || Kitt Peak || Spacewatch || — || align=right data-sort-value="0.96" | 960 m || 
|-id=991 bgcolor=#d6d6d6
| 463991 ||  || — || October 22, 2003 || Kitt Peak || Spacewatch || — || align=right | 2.8 km || 
|-id=992 bgcolor=#E9E9E9
| 463992 ||  || — || October 28, 2005 || Mount Lemmon || Mount Lemmon Survey || — || align=right | 1.8 km || 
|-id=993 bgcolor=#fefefe
| 463993 ||  || — || October 11, 2007 || Kitt Peak || Spacewatch || — || align=right data-sort-value="0.77" | 770 m || 
|-id=994 bgcolor=#d6d6d6
| 463994 ||  || — || March 2, 2006 || Kitt Peak || Spacewatch || — || align=right | 2.4 km || 
|-id=995 bgcolor=#E9E9E9
| 463995 ||  || — || August 24, 2001 || Kitt Peak || Spacewatch || — || align=right data-sort-value="0.93" | 930 m || 
|-id=996 bgcolor=#E9E9E9
| 463996 ||  || — || November 14, 2010 || Mount Lemmon || Mount Lemmon Survey || — || align=right | 1.0 km || 
|-id=997 bgcolor=#fefefe
| 463997 ||  || — || May 1, 2009 || Mount Lemmon || Mount Lemmon Survey || — || align=right data-sort-value="0.78" | 780 m || 
|-id=998 bgcolor=#d6d6d6
| 463998 ||  || — || November 20, 2003 || Socorro || LINEAR || — || align=right | 2.8 km || 
|-id=999 bgcolor=#d6d6d6
| 463999 ||  || — || April 4, 2005 || Kitt Peak || Spacewatch || — || align=right | 3.2 km || 
|-id=000 bgcolor=#E9E9E9
| 464000 ||  || — || October 10, 2001 || Kitt Peak || Spacewatch || — || align=right | 2.1 km || 
|}

References

External links 
 Discovery Circumstances: Numbered Minor Planets (460001)–(465000) (IAU Minor Planet Center)

0463